= Colette Bonzo =

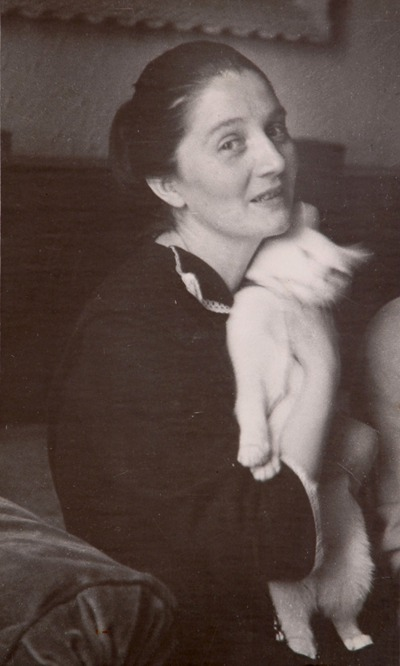
Colette Bonzo

Colette Bonzo (19 August 1916, Saron-sur-Aube — 14 January 1967, Paris) was a self-taught French painter. After marrying the Greek physician Élie Bontsolakis in 1939, she lived in Paris. She turned to painting after the Second World War, exhibiting frequently in Paris. In 1957, together with her husband she bought the Château du Pin in Ardèche where her brightly illuminated Impressionistic works were inspired by the sun and the surrounding countryside. Hundreds of her works including portraits, still lifes, large rose garden scenes and sketches are now exhibited there. Others can be seen in the Musée des Beaux-Arts de Bordeaux and in the Château de Tournon.

== Early life ==
Born on 10 August 1917 in the village of Saron-sur-Aube in the Marne department, Colette Bonzo studied French literature at the Sorbonne. In 1939, she married the Greek physician Élie Bontzolakis and lived with him in central Paris.

== Career ==
Bonzo had shown an interest in art since her childhood but had no formal training. Encouraged by her husband, during the Second World War, she took up painting, producing large, brightly coloured canvasses inspired by Impressionism. Her early works drew on social, political and religious themes but also included still lifes. After the end of the war, she regularly exhibited her works in Paris where they received considerable acclaim.

In 1957, she and her husband bought the 16th-century Château du Pin in the Cévennes district of the Ardèche. Bonzo's painting took a new turn as she produced works full of light and colour depicting the surroundings and the local inhabitants. Le Bal au bois de PaÏolive (1964), exhibited in the château is typical of the works she created there. L'Ours et le Lion, a landscape depicting the nearby Paîolive rocks, is also exhibited,

Bonzo suffered from poor health over the years, including tuberculosis for two years from 1949 and cancer in 1962 which slowly led to her death. Even when ill, she continued to paint with enthusiasm. She participated in exhibitions every year until 1966 at the Salon des Femmes Peintres.

Colette Bonzo died in Paris on 14 January 1967 and was buried in the cemetery at Fabras. In addition to the Château du Pin, many of her works have also been presented at the Château-Musée de Tournon-sur-Rhône.
