= Château de Ventadour (Ardèche) =

French ruined castle

Coordinates: 44°40′12″N 4°17′13″E

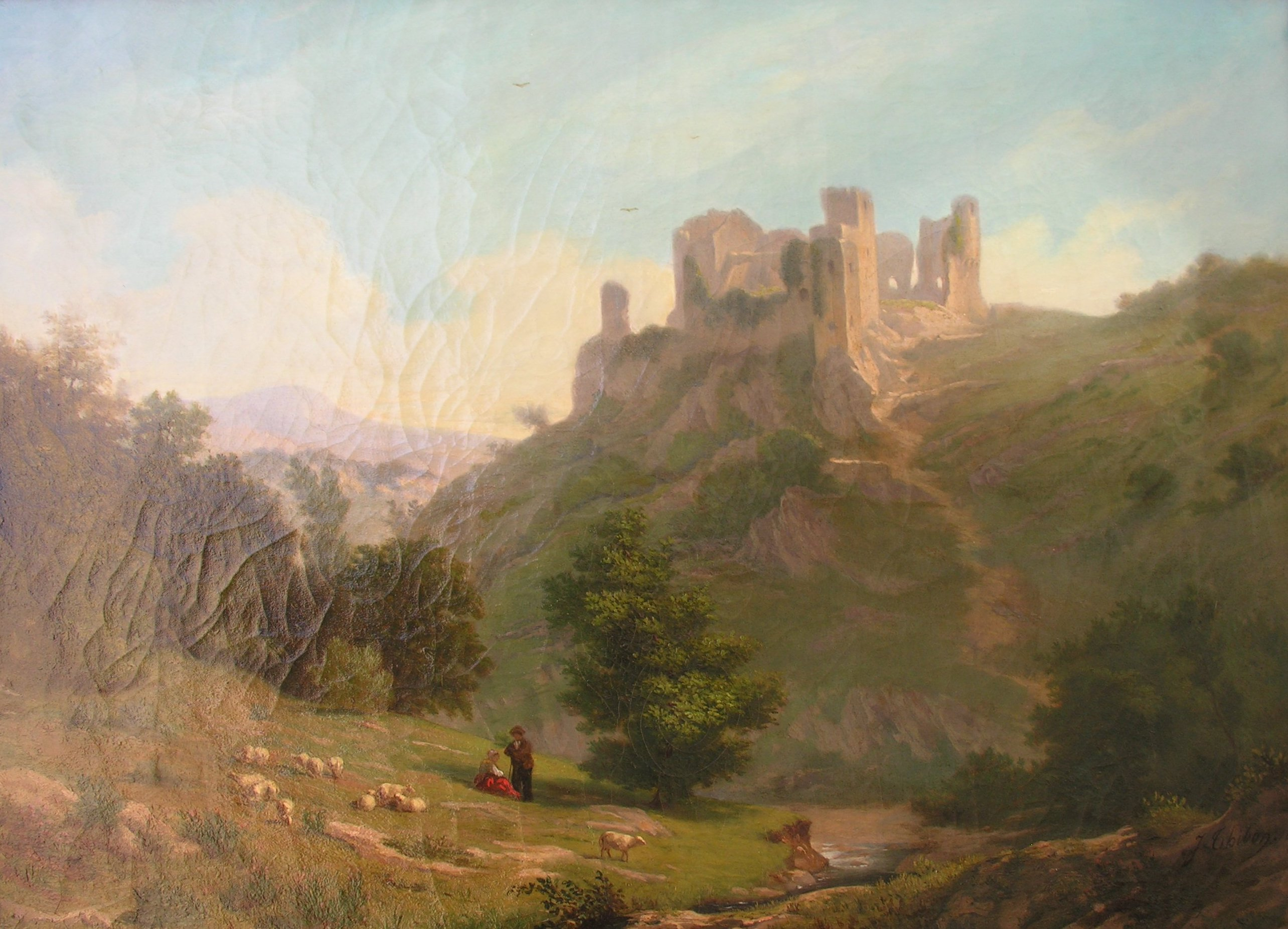
Château de Ventadour ruins in a painting by Jules Thibon

The Château de Ventadour is a ruined castle in the commune of Tournon-sur-Rhône in the Ardèche département of France. Situated to the south east of Meyras, the castle has architectural elements dating from the 11th, 12th, 15th and 16th centuries.

== Geography ==
The castle is situated 74 m above the confluence of Fontolière and Ardèche rivers, on a rocky outcrop, at about 373 m altitude

== History ==
The castle was built in the 12th century when the fief of Meyras belonged to the Solignacs. In 1195, the lord of Montlaur married Miracle de Solignac and her brother, Béraud de Solignac, relinquished to them the fief. The Solignacs left at the end of the 14th century, and in 1472 the lord of Meyras married Blanche de Ventadour. The castle was not inhabited again and, at the time of the French Revolution, was described as destroyed. After the Revolution, it was largely used as a stone quarry. A painting by Jules Thibon, Les ruines du château de Ventadour, painted in 1860 and in a private collection, shows its state in the 19th century.

Since 1969, it has been the object of a restoration project by Pierre and Françoise Pottier and a handful of volunteers. Visitors can see a square tower, two pigeon lofts and a fortified gateway.

The castle was restored by the voluntary work organisation, Union REMPART.

== Architecture ==
The castle plan is based on the typical Savoy castle model, the keep being attached to the surrounding wall.

According to research works on site and a paper by Georges Grégoire, the oldest part of the castle is the square keep.

The exterior fortification is accessible via a drawbridge. The square tower in the north east corner comprises vaulted rooms. The square tower in the south west corner is topped by two bartizans dating from work carried out in the 14th century.

It has been listed since 1927 as a monument historique by the French Ministry of Culture, with additional protection in 1938 and 1960.

== See also ==
- List of castles in France
- Meyras
