= Jacques Yankel =

French painter (1920–2020)

- Born: Jakob Kikoïne; 14 April 1920; Paris, France
- Died: 2 April 2020 (aged 99); Labeaume, France
- Occupation: Artist

Jacques Yankel, born Jakob Kikoïne (14 April 1920 – 2 April 2020) was a French painter, sculptor, and lithographer.

== Biography ==
Five years after his sister, Claire, Yankel was born at the Boucicaut Hospital in Paris. His parents were Michel Kikoine and Rosa Bunimovitz. Yankel grew up in La Ruche in the 15th arrondissement of Paris, where his family stayed until 1926. That year, his father acquired a house in Annay-sur-Serein, and the family moved to Montrouge. They then moved to Montparnasse in 1933.

After poor performances in school, Yankel was denied from the École nationale supérieure des arts appliqués et des métiers d'art (ENSAAMA) and the École nationale supérieure des Beaux-Arts (ENSBA). During World War II, he held temporary jobs in printing and engraving workshops. In 1941, he moved to Toulouse, in the Zone libre, and became an apprentice geologist. That year, he married Raymonde Jouve, with his parents crossing the demarcation line to be present at the wedding. He continued his studies and graduated with a degree in geology from the Faculté des sciences de Toulouse. In 1946, his daughter, Dinah Kikoïne, was born. He worked as an amateur painter in a group alongside Jean Hugon, Michel Goedgebuer, Bernard Pagès, Christian Schmidt, André-François Vernette, and Jean Teulières.

In 1949, Yankel was hired by the Ministry of the Overseas for the geological mapping of French West Africa. During this time, he acquired a taste for African art and began collecting it. He unexpectedly met Simone de Beauvoir and Jean-Paul Sartre while in Gao, the latter of which encouraged him to return to painting.

In 1952, Yankel returned to Paris, resettling in La Ruche, and made his public debut as a painter at the Galerie Lara Vinci on Rue de Seine. When he was defending his thesis in geology at the Sorbonne in 1954, he also exhibited his works in Paris and Mulhouse. He won the Prix Neumann, shared with Réginald Pollack, as well as the Prix Fénéon.

From 1957 to 1959, Yankel continued to exhibit and travel in the Maghreb, the Balearic Islands, Geneva, and Israel. In 1960, he remarried to Jacqueline Daneyrole in Labeaume. From 1961 to 1965, he exhibited in Paris, Israel, and Amsterdam. In 1966, his mother died. The following year, he went to Israel for the Six-Day War, staying in the kibbutzes of Zikhron Ya'akov, and Ma'ayan Tzvi for three months.

Yankel's father died in 1968, the same year in which he was hired as a plastic arts teacher at the ENSBA. He continued teaching until 1985, and students from the École des Beaux- Arts d'Abidjan continued visiting his workshop. He subsequently presented Arts africains - Sculptures d'hier, peintures d'aujourd'hui, an exhibition organized by the Association pour la défense et l'illustration des arts d'Afrique et d'Océanie (ADEIAO) and displayed at the Palais de la Porte Dorée in Paris.

In 1987, he married his third wife, Lidia Syroka. That year, he also donated art to a museum for the first time, to the Musée des arts naïfs et populaires in Noyers-sur-Serein. He did not donate again until 2018.[13] In 2019, Jean-François Lacour, Yankel's editor, said “He will be a hundred years old in April 2020, and what is surprising is his youth: he paints, draws and talks about art like a child ”.

Jacques Yankel died on 2 April 2020 in Labeaume, 12 days before his 100th birthday.

== Critical reception ==
- "Yankel loves the timbre of colors more than their melodies. He draws chords which cause real jolts. Like Igor Stravinsky practicing music with cymbals, he practices painting with pure colors. Both have the same concept of refinement. They know that the senses will react with all the more subtlety in the bass as they have been further removed from this register by the treble. The large major colors of Yankél, and others, minor, more tenuous, accentuate the resemblance to a musical score." - Gérard Mourgue
- Kikoine's son heard the father's advice: 'express yourself on your own'; he spent his adolescence in the intimacy of Soutine, Zadkine, the many Slavic friends of Kikoine. It suggests the essentials in a few judiciously placed touches: blues, greens, reds expertly orchestrated. For our happiness, Yankel likes to tell stories: he published an album of memories, reflections, earthy adventures, punctuated by numerous drawings and watercolors, The Despair of the painter, then a book of memories, Worse to paint, where he handles with humor and modesty self-mockery." - Gérald Schurr
- "In the fifties, his art proceeds from expressionism, referring to Gruber, Lorjou, Buffet, Rebeyrolle, with solid qualities of material. After 1960, he moved away from expressionism to reach a greater freedom of plastic invention, in a kind of abstract expressionism ... The best part of his work perhaps consists in that he painted directly with my fingers, full tubes: 'I came to rediscover the simple and essential rhythms of the large flows of roofs in the village, the furrows, the superb wrinkles of nature', then fully participating in some of his subjects, neglecting the anecdote to retain only the primordial rhythms, in agreement with the universal." - Jacques Busse

== Prizes ==
- Prix d'Afrique du Nord (1953)
- 2nd Prix de la Jeune Peinture (1953)
- Prix Maurice Pierre (1953)
- Prix de la Société des amateurs d'art (1954)
- Prix Neumann (1955)

== Public Collections ==
=== France ===
- Église romane Sainte Marie-Madeleine de Balazuc
- Musée des Beaux-Arts de Chartres
- ENSBA
- Musée d'Art Moderne de Paris
- Musée Sainte-Croix
- Musée des Augustins

=== Israel ===
- Musée Helena Rubinstein

=== Switzerland ===
- Musée de l'Athénée
