= Astet =

- Commune
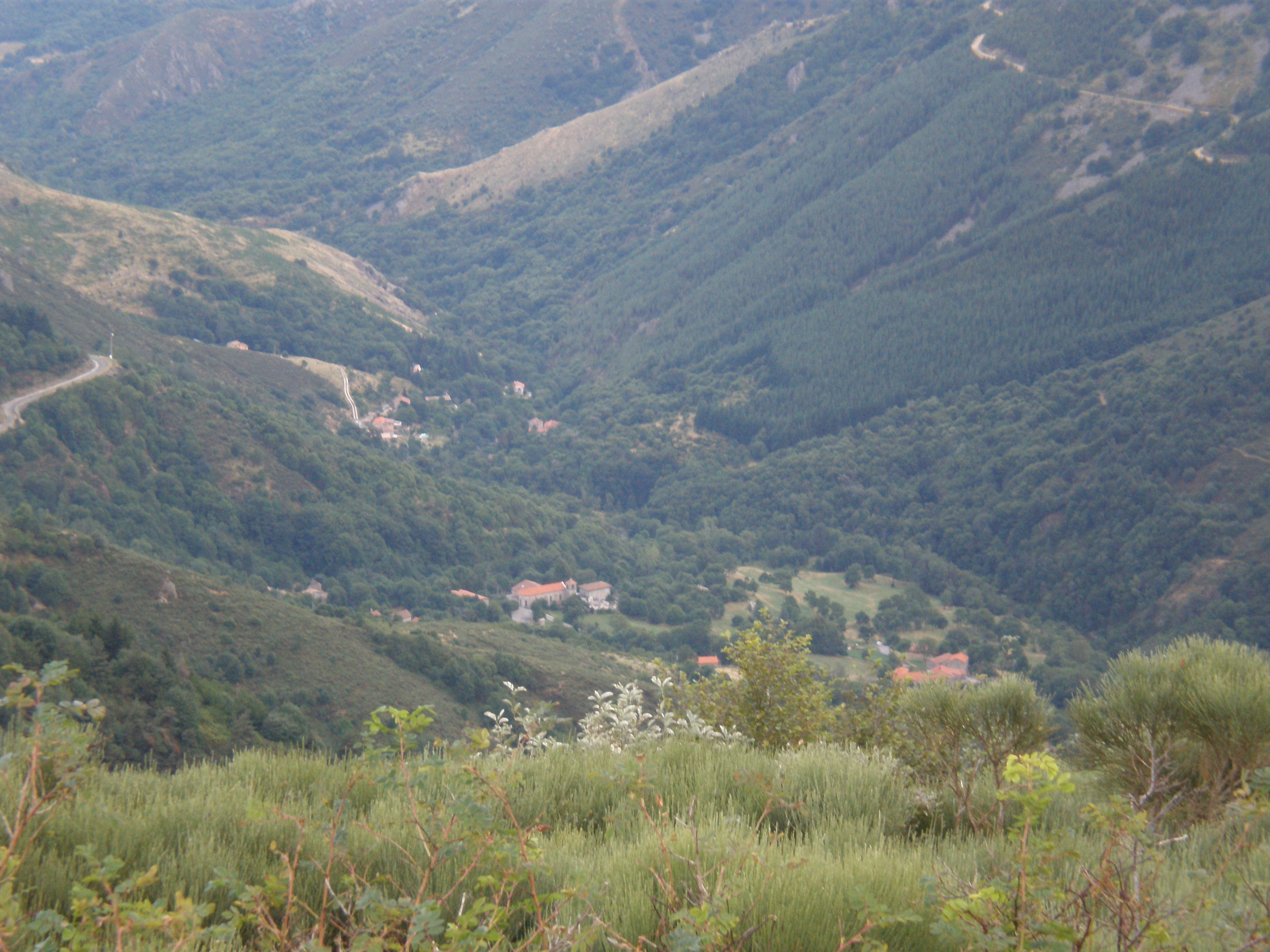
- View of Astet from the Col de la Chavade (1266m)
- Location of Astet
- Location within France Location within Auvergne-Rhône-Alpes
- Coordinates: 44°41′54″N 4°01′34″E
- Country: France
- Region: Auvergne-Rhône-Alpes
- Department: Ardèche
- Arrondissement: Largentière
- Canton: Haute-Ardèche
- Intercommunality: CC Montagne d'Ardèche

Government
  - Mayor (2020–2026): Christian Vidal
- Area^{1}: 34.45 km^{2} (13.30 sq mi)
- Elevation: 840 m (2,760 ft)
- Highest elevation: 1,544 m (5,066 ft)
- Lowest elevation: 746 m (2,448 ft)
- Population (2023): 59
  - Density: 1.7/km^{2} (4.4/sq mi)
- Time zone: UTC+01:00 (CET)
  - Summer (DST): UTC+02:00 (CEST)
- INSEE/Postal code: 07018 /07330
- ^{1} French Land Register data, which excludes lakes, ponds, glaciers > 1 km^{2} (0.386 sq mi or 247 acres) and river estuaries.

Astet (French pronunciation: [astɛ]) is a commune in the Ardèche department in the Auvergne-Rhône-Alpes region of southern France.

== Geography ==
Astet is located some 30 km west by north-west of Aubenas and 15 km east by south-east of Langogne. Access to the commune is by Route nationale N102 from Lanarce in the north-west passing through the north of the commune and continuing over the Col de la Chavade in the centre of the commune then south-east to Mayres. The N102 is a heavily used road between the Rhône Valley and the Massif Central. There is also the D239 coming from Saint-Cirgues-en-Montagne in the north-east passing through the centre of the commune, crossing the N102 at the Col de la Chavade and continuing south to join the D19. The village is located in the east of the commune and is reached by a short but tortuous road from the N102. Apart from the village there is also the hamlet of Sedassier to the south-east. The commune covers 3,445 hectares with the highest point at Les Valadous at 1,548m.

The Ardèche river has its source in the centre of the commune and it flows south-west gathering many tributaries in the commune: the Ruisseau des Chaplades, the Ruisseau de Paillayre, the Ruisseau de Pierne, the Ruisseau de la Bessede, the Ruisseau de Fiagouse, the Ruisseau des Gardettes, the Ruisseau de Pierne, and the Ruisseau de la Bessede. It begins its journey to join the Rhône at Pont-Saint-Esprit in Astet. The Espezonnette rises in the south of the commune with many tributaries: the Ruisseau de la Ferme, the Ruisseau du Gouffre, the Ruisseau de Montgros, and the Ruisseau de l'Ane. It flows north forming a small part of the northern border before continuing to join the Allier just south of the Langogne-Lesperon Aerodrome.

== History ==
First established as a parish in 1770, Astet became a commune in 1907 by separating from the large commune of Mayres. Astet had over 500 inhabitants in 1911 but this has decreased to 41 in 2010. The First World War resulted in a reduction in population then the desertification of the land in the 1950s.

== Administration ==
List of Successive Mayors

From	To	Name
1989	current	Christian Vidal

== Demography ==
The inhabitants of the commune are known as Asténiens or Asténiennes in French.

Historical population

Year	Pop.	±% p.a.
1911	482	—
1921	427	−1.20%
1926	389	−1.85%
1931	340	−2.66%
1936	302	−2.34%
1946	302	+0.00%
1954	235	−3.09%
1962	166	−4.25%
1968	139	−2.92%

Year	Pop.	±% p.a.
1975	109	−3.41%
1982	73	−5.57%
1990	67	−1.07%
1999	51	−2.99%
2007	44	−1.83%
2012	38	−2.89%
2017	42	+2.02%
2023	59	+5.83%

Source: EHESS and INSEE

== Sites and monuments ==
- Les Valadous the highest point in the Serre de la Croix de Bauzon at 1,548m.
- Col de la Chavade
- Col du Pendu
- La Chavade-Bel-Air Ski Resort
- A Church from the 19th century
- The source of the Ardèche river in the Mazan Forest
- Wind turbines operated by Électricité de France

The GR7 path passes through the centre of the commune parallel with the D239.

== See also ==
- Communes of the Ardèche department
