= Veniamin Kletzel =

Soviet and Israeli expressionist painter

Veniamin (Benjamin) Kletzel
- Self-portrait in red
- Born: Veniamin Kletzel; May 5, 1932; Ukrainka, Dnipropetrovsk Oblast, Ukrainian SSR, Soviet Union
- Died: June 18, 2021 (aged 89); Jerusalem, Israel
- Education: Tashkent Art College
- Known for: Painting, graphics
- Movement: Expressionism, School of Paris (Jewish Montparnasse), Turkestan avant-garde

Veniamin Kletzel (Russian: Вениамин Клецель; 1932–2021) was a Soviet and Israeli expressionist painter and graphic artist. Widely regarded as an important successor to the post-impressionist traditions of the Turkestan avant-garde and the artistic movement historically referred to as the "Jewish Montparnasse" (School of Paris), Kletzel developed a synthesis of vivid color expressionism, figurative symbolism, and deep psychological narrative.

His career spanned several artistic phases, beginning in the Soviet Union—where he worked in Tashkent and Samara—and culminating in Jerusalem following his immigration to Israel in the early 1990s. In his mature Jerusalem period, Kletzel produced an extensive body of work exploring Hasidic traditional life, biblical folklore, portraiture, and urban landscapes.

== Biography ==
=== Early life and artistic formation in Tashkent ===
Veniamin Kletzel was born in 1932 in Ukrainka, Dnipropetrovsk Oblast, Ukrainian SSR. During the World War II evacuation, his family relocated to Central Asia. Settling in Tashkent, Uzbek SSR, Kletzel received his formal training at the Tashkent Art College, a major cultural center in post-war Soviet Central Asia.

During the mid-20th century, Tashkent harbored a rich artistic environment shaped by evacuated European and Russian avant-garde painters. It was here that Kletzel was exposed to the traditions of the Turkestan avant-garde, a movement characterized by the combination of European post-impressionist color theory with Oriental decorative motifs and intense sunlight exposure.

=== The Volga period: Samara ===
Following his studies, Kletzel relocated to Samara (then known as Kuibyshev) on the Volga River, where he established himself as an active member of the local artistic community. During his decades in Samara, he actively participated in regional and national exhibitions. His Soviet-era works balanced official artistic expectations with an underlying adherence to Cézannism and early 20th-century Russian avant-garde techniques, specifically drawing inspiration from the Bubnovy Valet group. In 1976, he was accepted into the Union of Artists of the USSR.

=== Immigration to Israel and the Jerusalem period ===
In 1990, during the mass emigration of Jews from the collapsing Soviet Union, Kletzel relocated to Israel and settled in Jerusalem. The relocation triggered a profound evolution in his creative trajectory. Captivated by the distinctive light, stone architecture, and spiritual atmosphere of the Old City, he immersed himself in documenting local life.

In Jerusalem, Kletzel operated a studio that attracted art collectors, critics, and fellow artists. He became a prominent figure among Russian-speaking Israeli artists, regularly exhibiting in municipal galleries, cultural institutes, and private exhibition spaces. In 2007, he was awarded the "Olive of Jerusalem" prize for his contribution to Israeli art. Kletzel continued working actively in Jerusalem until his death in 2021.

== Artistic style, themes, and legacy ==
=== Synthesis of Parisian expressionism and Central Asian colorism ===
Art historians, including the sociologist and art critic Alek D. Epstein, categorize Kletzel's work as a late continuation of the "Jewish Montparnasse"—a term used to describe early 20th-century Jewish expressionists associated with the School of Paris, such as Chaim Soutine, Marc Chagall, and Michel Kikoine.

Kletzel adapted these European expressionist impulses through the prism of Soviet orientalism. His technique features heavy impasto, expressive, rhythmic brushstrokes, dynamic deformation of shapes, and a heightened emotional palette. Rather than aiming for photo-realistic accuracy, he prioritized the inner psychological state of his subjects and the emotional resonance of the scene.

=== Core thematic cycles ===
- The Hasidic and Biblical World: Kletzel created extensive thematic series depicting orthodox Jewish life. His subjects included rabbis in study, musicians playing traditional Jewish folk instruments, wedding celebrations, and Hasidic dances. These works are characterized by a sense of movement, warmth, and nostalgic folklore.
- Jerusalem Landscapes: His cityscapes explore the interplay of sunlight and ancient stone in Jerusalem. He frequently depicted narrow alleyways, market stalls, and panoramic views of the city, focusing on contrasting primary colors.

=== Portraiture and Self-Portraits ===
Self-portrait in red by Veniamin Kletzel

Throughout his life, Kletzel painted portraits of cultural figures, friends, and family, as well as a series of candid self-portraits capturing his evolving identity as an artist across different geographic contexts. He was known for painting quickly and expressively, focusing entirely on the psychological characteristics of the sitter rather than flattering their physical appearance.

=== Recognition and critical reception ===
Monographic studies published by Alek D. Epstein, such as The Heir to the Turkestan Avant-Garde (2014) and The Art I Will Never Tire of Serving (2023), position Kletzel as a significant transitional figure connecting pre-war Eastern European Jewish expressionism, late Soviet non-conformism, and modern Israeli art.

Kletzel's art has been exhibited internationally and featured in art markets and auction houses, including Russian art sales handled by Sotheby's and specialized platforms like Bidspirit. In Jerusalem, initiatives such as the "Beit Kletzel" project continue to document and catalogue his artistic heritage.

== Exhibitions ==
Throughout his career, Veniamin Kletzel actively participated in numerous regional, national, and international exhibitions. Below is a comprehensive list of his selected solo and group exhibitions.

Soviet Period (1968–1990) During his time in Kuibyshev (Samara), Kletzel held several solo exhibitions and regularly participated in regional and all-Union shows.

- 1968 — Solo Exhibition. Museum of Fine Arts, Kuibyshev (Samara), USSR.
- 1975 — Group Exhibition. 30th Anniversary of WW II All-Union Exhibition. Municipal Museum, Volgograd, USSR.
- 1976 — Group Exhibition. The Greater Volga Regional Exhibition. Museum of Fine Arts, Gorky, USSR.
- 1976 — Group Exhibition. Art Museum, Stara Zagora, Bulgaria.
- 1982 — Solo Exhibition. Artist’s 50th Jubilee. Museum of Fine Arts, Kuibyshev (Samara), USSR.

Israeli Period (1990–2021) Following his repatriation to Jerusalem in 1990, Kletzel exhibited extensively in key cultural centers across Israel, Russia, and the United States.

- 1993 — Solo Exhibition. Immigrant’s Communities House, Jerusalem, Israel.
- 1994 — Solo Exhibition. Rehavia Community Center, Jerusalem, Israel.
- 1995 — Solo Exhibition. Jewish Community Center, Chicago, USA.
- 1996 — Solo Exhibition. Aviv Gallery, Tel Aviv, Israel.
- 1997 — Group Exhibition of Jerusalem artists. Immigrant’s Cultural Center, Jerusalem, Israel.
- 1998 — Solo Exhibition. Samara Regional Art Museum, Samara, Russia.
- 2000 — Group Exhibition. Binyanei Ha’uma, Jerusalem, Israel.
- 2001 — Solo Exhibition. Nina Gallery, Jerusalem, Israel.
- 2001 — Group Exhibition. Jerusalem Theatre (Teatron Yerushalaim), Jerusalem, Israel.
- 2002 — Solo Exhibition. Artist’s 70th Jubilee. Immigrant’s Cultural Center, Jerusalem, Israel.
- 2002 — Solo Exhibition. Teena Gallery, Jerusalem, Israel.
- 2004 — Solo Exhibition. Samara Regional Art Museum, Samara, Russia.
- 2005 — "Self Portrait", Solo Exhibition. Teena Gallery, Jerusalem, Israel.
- 2007 — Solo Exhibition marking the artist’s 75th birthday. Cultural centers and galleries of Jerusalem and Tel Aviv, Israel.
- 2017 (December) — Exhibition of new works. Jerusalem Russian Library Exhibition Hall (Shukanyon), Jerusalem, Israel.
- 2019 (November) — "Painting, Graphics. Selected Works", Retrospective Solo Exhibition. Samara Regional Art Museum (Marble Hall), Samara, Russia.

Posthumous Exhibitions (Since 2021)

- 2023 (July) — "Son of Three Cities" (Curated by Galina Matveeva-Finkelshtein). Retrospective solo exhibition. DC Gallery, Moscow, Russia.

== Public collections ==
Veniamin Kletzel's works are held in public and private museum collections across Eastern Europe, Israel, and North America, including:

- Samara Regional Art Museum (Samara, Russia)
- Museum collections in Tashkent (Uzbekistan)
- Various institutional and municipal art collections in Jerusalem and Tel Aviv
- G-Gallery collection (Israel)

== Publications and Monographs ==
- Epstein, Alek D. (2014). The Heir to the Turkestan Avant-Garde, the "Jack of Diamonds" and the Art of the Jewish Montparnasse: Jerusalem Artist Veniamin Kletzel. Moscow/Jerusalem: DAAT/Znanie. 320 pp.
- Epstein, Alek D. (2023). The Art I Will Never Tire of Serving. St. Petersburg: DEAN Publishing. (Includes the chapter: "From the Jewish Montparnasse to Jerusalem: The Path of Artist Veniamin Kletzel", pp. 154-212).
