= Ardèche (river) =

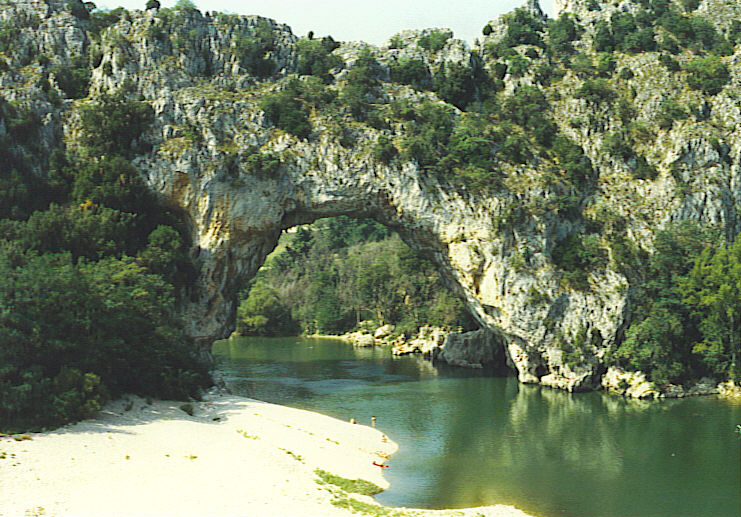
- The Pont d'Arc over the Ardèche River.

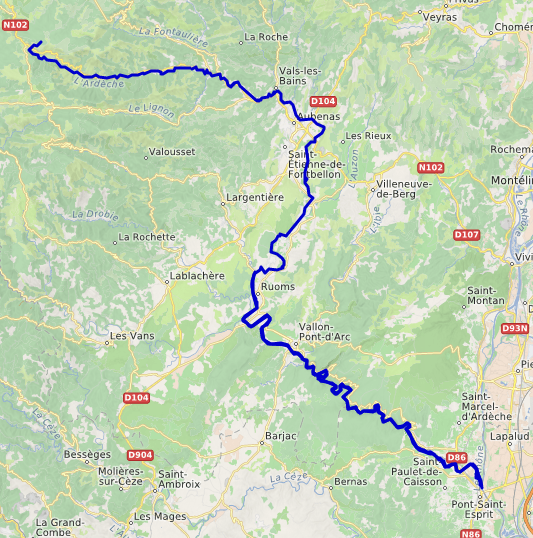

Location
- Country: France

Physical characteristics
- Source
  - location: Massif Central
  - coordinates: 44.7°N 4.04473°E
- Mouth
  - location: Rhône
  - coordinates: 44°15′52″N 4°38′53″E
- Length: 125 km (78 mi)
- Basin size: 2,430 km^{2} (940 mi^{2})
- Discharge
  - average: 65 m^{3}/s (2,300 cu ft/s)

Basin features
- Progression: Rhône→ Mediterranean Sea

The Ardèche (French: [aʁdɛʃ]; Occitan: Ardecha) is a 125-kilometre (78 mi) long river in south-central France, a right-bank tributary of the River Rhône. Its source is in the Massif Central, near the village of Astet. It flows into the Rhône near Pont-Saint-Esprit, north-west of Orange. The river gives its name to the French department of Ardèche.

The valley of the Ardèche is very scenic, in particular a 30-kilometre (19 mi) section known as the Ardèche Gorges. The walls of the river here are limestone cliffs up to 300 metres (980 ft) high. A kayak and camping trip down the gorge is not technically difficult and is very popular in the summer. The most famous feature is a natural 60-metre (200 ft) stone arch spanning the river known as the Pont d'Arc (arch bridge).

== Geography ==
The source of the river lies at 1,467 metres (4,813 ft) above sea level in the Vivarais, near the Col de la Chavade, in the forest of Mazan in the commune of Astet. After the towns of Aubenas and Ruoms, it collects the Chassezac and the Beaume and plunges into its famous gorge below Vallon-Pont-d'Arc. It flows into the Rhône at Pont-Saint-Esprit.

== Departments and communes ==
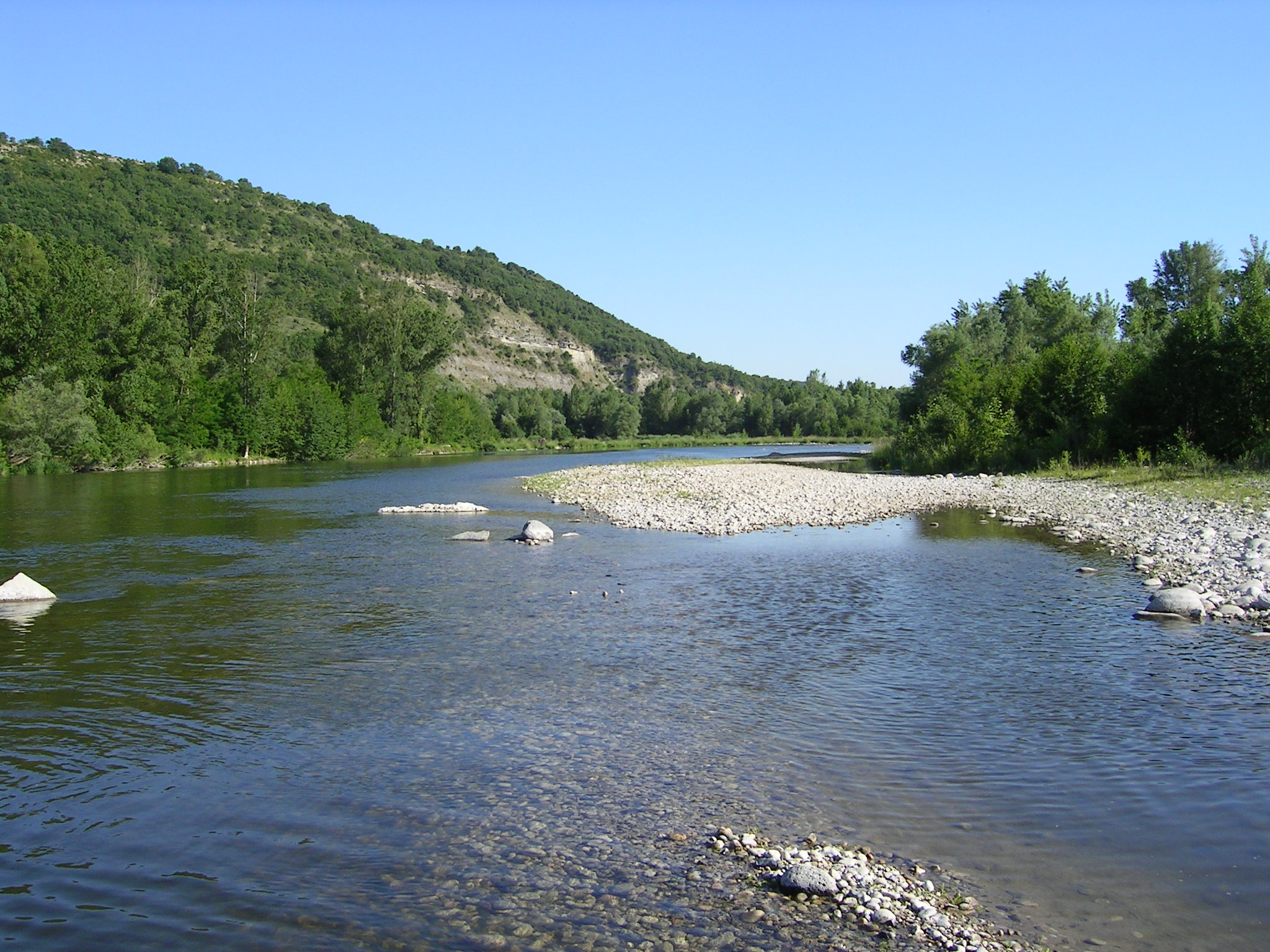
Ardèche River near Aubenas

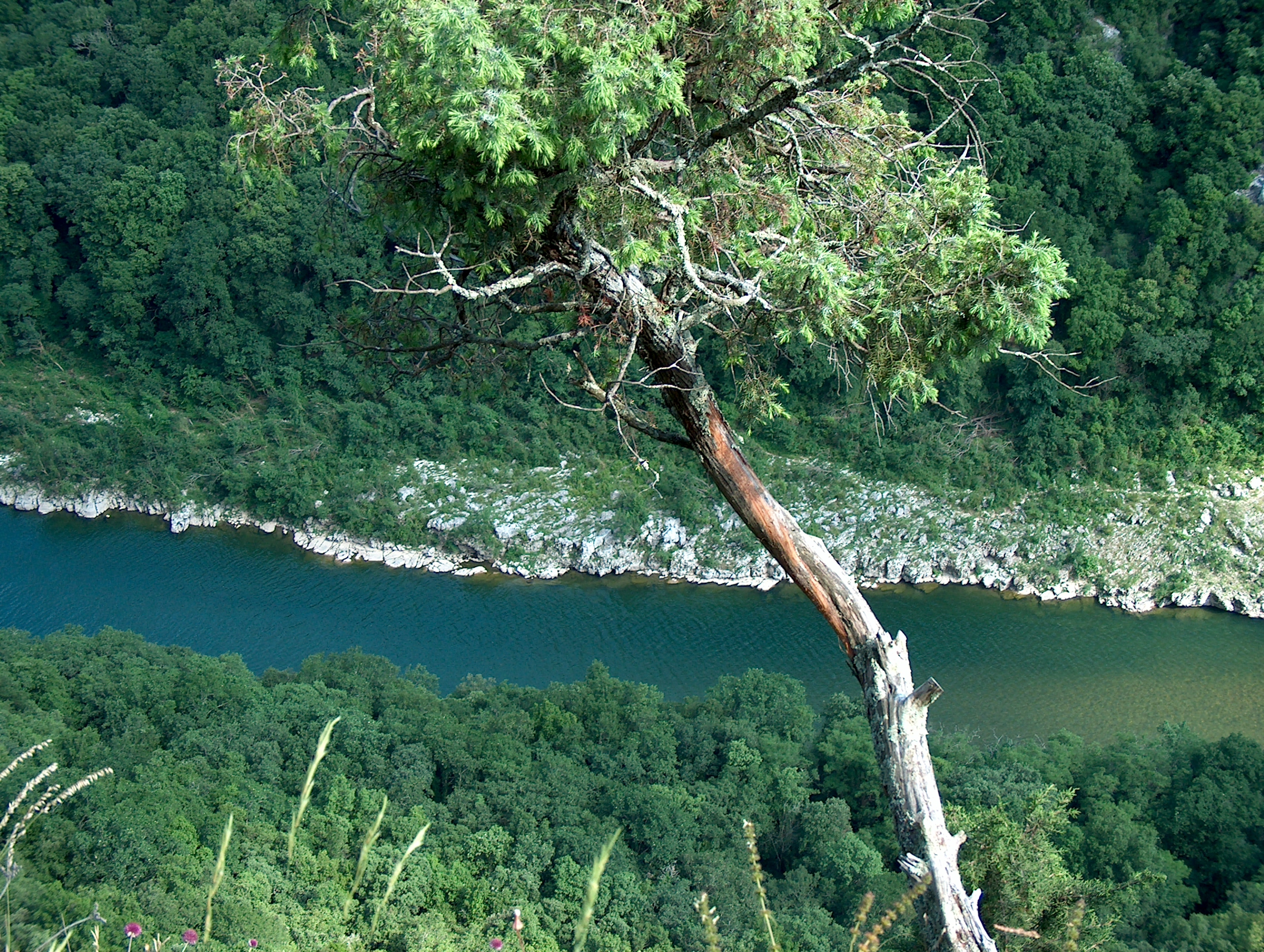
Part of the Ardèche River

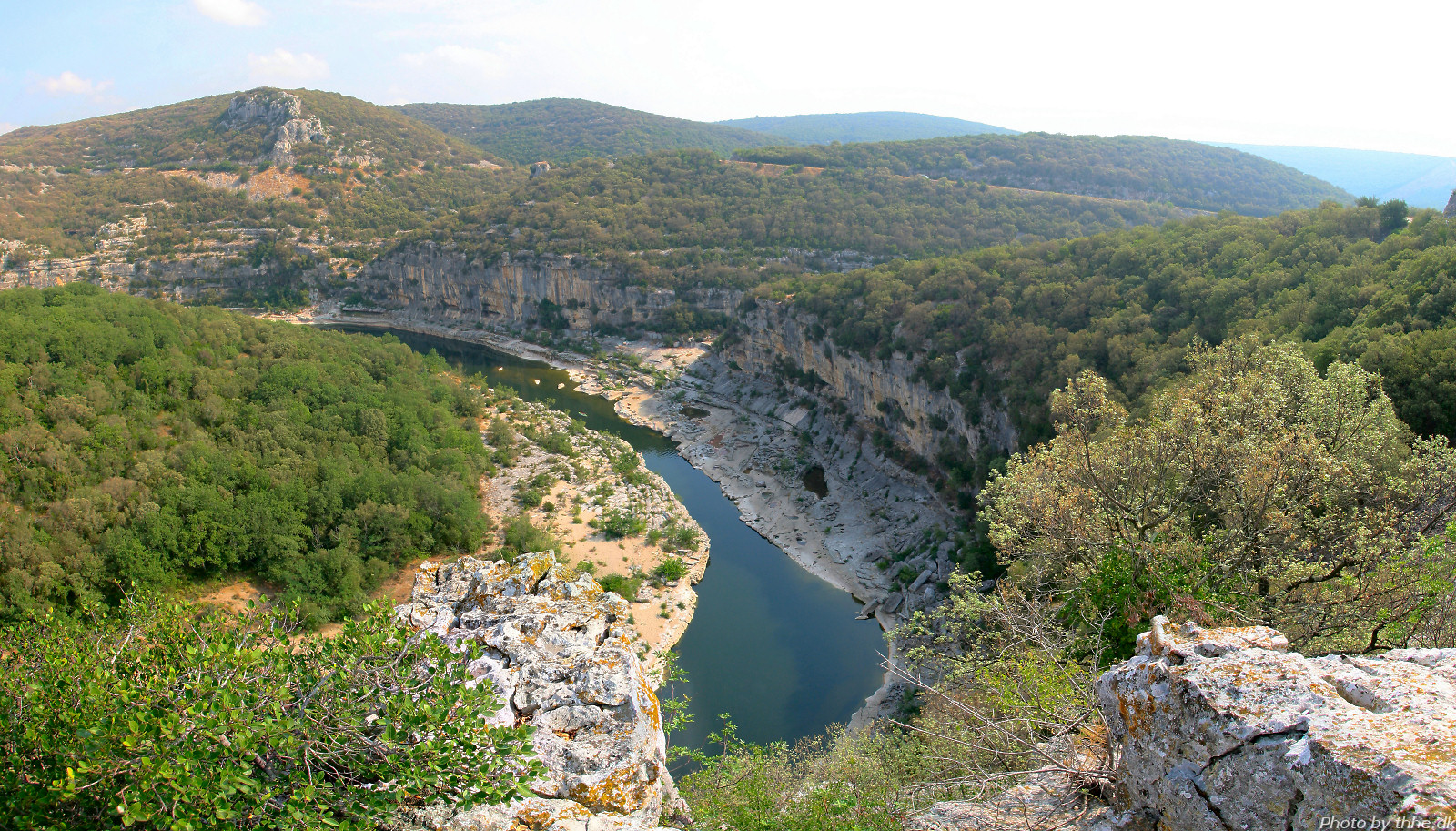
Ardèche River panorama

The Ardèche flows through the following departments and communes:

- Department of Ardèche (named after the river):
  - Astet (source)
  - Mayres (Le Lignon joins)
  - Barnas
  - Thueyts
  - Pont-de-Labeaume (La Fontolliere joins)
  - Lalevade-d'Ardeche (right bank)
  - Vals-les-Bains (left bank) (La Volane joins)
  - Labégude (right bank)
  - Ucel (left bank)
  - Saint-Privat (left bank) (Le Luol joins)
  - Aubenas (right bank)
  - Saint-Didier-sous-Aubenas
  - Saint-Étienne-de-Fontbellon (right bank)
  - Vogüé
  - Lanas (right bank)
  - Saint-Maurice-d'Ardeche (left bank) (L'Auzon joins)
  - Balazuc
  - Chauzon (right bank)
  - Pradons (left bank)
  - Ruoms (left bank)
  - Labeaume (right bank) (La Ligne joins)
  - Saint-Alban-Auriolles (right bank) (La Beaume and La Cassezac joins)
  - Vallon-Pont-d'Arc (left bank) (L'Ibie joins)
  - Salavas (right bank)
  - Labastide-de-Virac (right bank)
  - Saint-Remèze (left bank) (Gorges de l'Ardeche)
  - Bidon (left bank)
  - Saint-Martin-d'Ardeche (left bank)
  - Saint-Just-d'Ardèche (left bank)
- Department of Gard
  - Le Garn (right bank)
  - Aiguèze (right bank)
  - Saint-Julien-de-Peyrolas
  - Saint-Paulet-de-Caisson
  - Pont-Saint-Esprit (joins the Rhône)

== Tributaries ==
The most important tributaries and subtributaries to the Ardèche include:

Left tributary	Right tributary
Fontolière; Volane; Luol; Auzon; Ibie	Lignon; Ligne; Baume; Drobie; Chassezac; Altier; Borne

== Hydrology ==
The river has an average discharge of 65 cubic metres per second (2,300 cu ft/s) but experiences severe floods, called "coups de l'Ardèche" (Blows of the Ardèche), in spring and autumn and periods of very low water in summer. During flood events in 1827, 1890, and 1924, it reached 7,800 cubic metres per second (280,000 cu ft/s) and the water level rose to a record 21.4 metres (70 ft) in the gorge.

Despite the Ardèche's short length, the flow of the river at 65 cubic metres per second (2,300 cu ft/s) is relatively high—higher than the Gardon at 32 cubic metres per second (1,100 cu ft/s), the Cèze (22 m3/s), the Hérault (44 m3/s), or the Agout (55 m3/s)—major rivers south of the Massif Central but much longer.

=== Rates of flow at Saint-Martin d'Ardèche ===
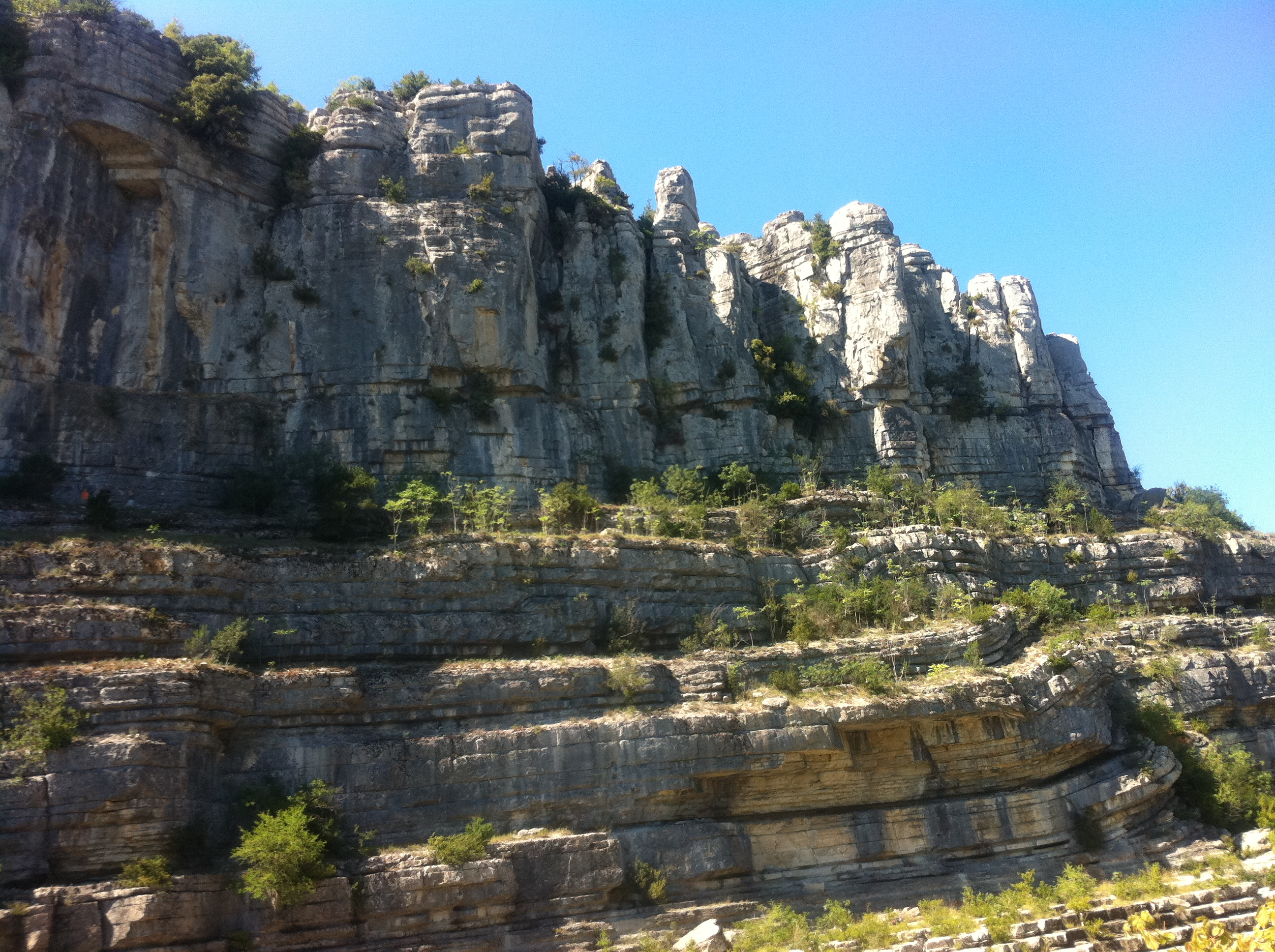
Cliffs along the Ardèche

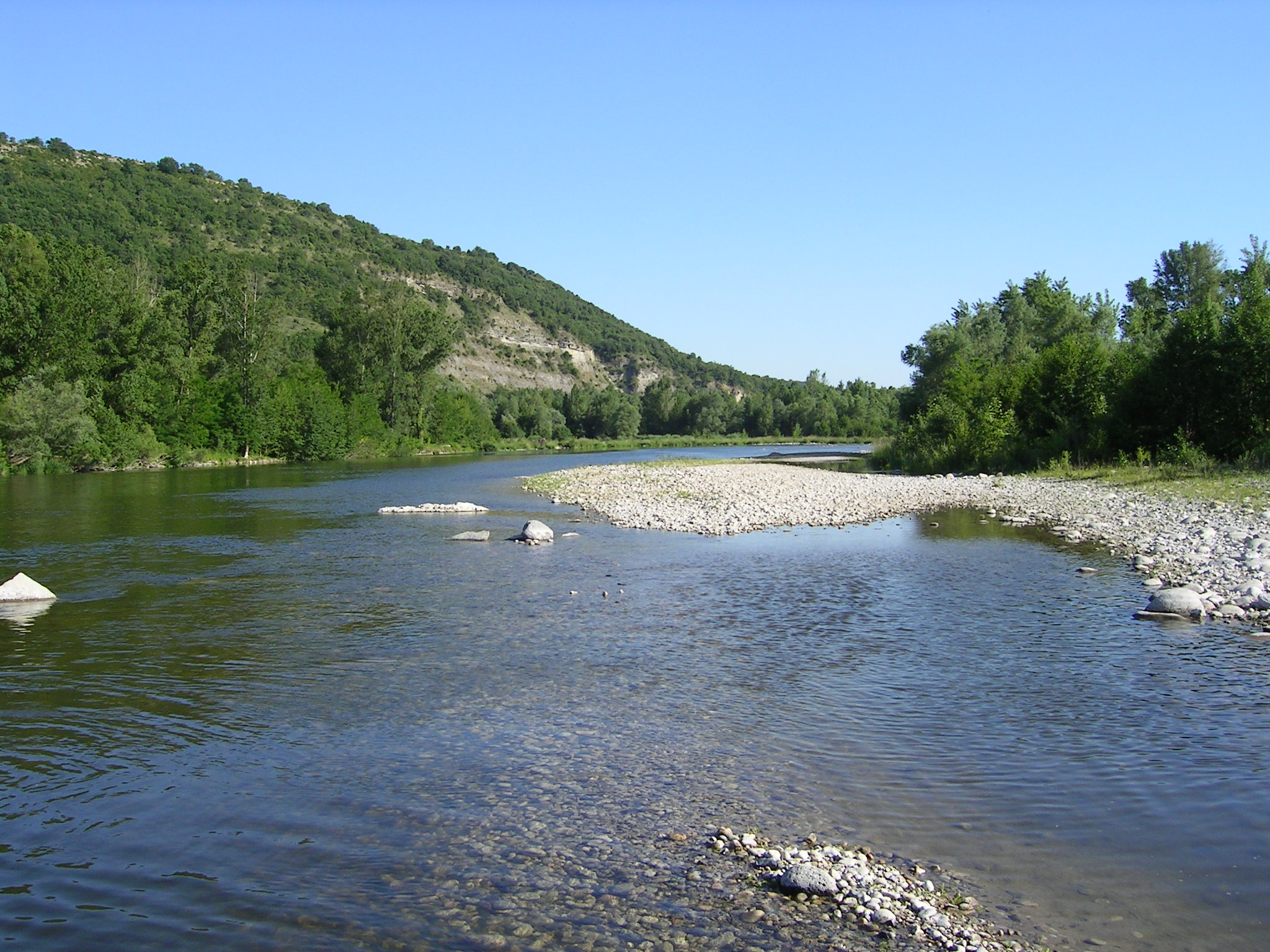
The Ardèche near Aubenas

The inter-annual average flow of the Ardèche was observed and calculated over a period of 26 years at Saint-Martin d'Ardèche. It amounted to 63.4 cubic metres per second (2,240 cu ft/s) for a surface basin of 2,240 square kilometres (860 mi^{2})—i.e. the vast majority of its watershed of 2,430 square kilometres (940 mi^{2}). The river has seasonal fluctuations: a typical flow around the Cevennes, with high water in autumn and winter being double the normal, brings the average monthly flow at the first peak of 93 cubic metres per second (3,300 cu ft/s) in October then, after falling to 76 cubic metres per second (2,700 cu ft/s) in December, a new peak occurs from 96 to 102 cubic metres per second (3,400 to 3,600 cu ft/s) in January–March (with a maximum in January). A rapid decline in flow rate follows ending in a dry period in July–August resulting in a decrease of the average monthly rate to the level of 12 cubic metres per second (420 cu ft/s) in July. (See bar chart below.)

The VCN3 (minimum flow) can drop to 2.5 cubic metres per second (88 cu ft/s) in a dry year.

Floods can be extremely important (usually following storms in the Cevennes). The Qix 2 and Qix 5 are respectively 1,800 and 2,600 cubic metres per second (64,000 and 92,000 cu ft/s) which is high. QIX 10 is 3,100 cubic metres per second (110,000 cu ft/s) while QIX 20 and QIX 50 respectively rise to 3,600 and 4,300 cubic metres per second (130,000 and 150,000 cu ft/s).

The maximum instantaneous flow recorded in Saint-Martin d'Ardèche has been 4,500 cubic metres per second (160,000 cu ft/s) (two-thirds of the average flow of the Danube), while the maximum recorded daily rate was 2,506 cubic metres per second (88,500 cu ft/s).

The runoff curve number flowing into the catchment of the river is 897 millimetres (35.3 in) annually, which is very high. The specific flow (Qs) reaches 28.3 litres per second per square kilometre of the catchment.

Mean monthly discharge (in m^{3}/s)
Hydrological station : Saint-Martin-d'Ardèche (data calculated over 54 years)

=== Flows of waterways in the Ardèche catchment ===
Waterway	Location	Flows in m^{3} per second							Side max(m)	Max. instant	Max. journ.	Runoff Curve (mm)	Area (km^{2})
Waterway	Location	Module	VCN3 (low water)	QIX 2	QIX 5	QIX 10	QIX 20	QIX 50	Side max(m)	Max. instant	Max. journ.	Runoff Curve (mm)	Area (km^{2})
Ardèche	Meyras	3.52	0.090	150	230	280	330	-	4.09	360	157	1,092	102
Ardèche	Pont-de-Labeaume	16.30	0.550	400	590	710	830	980	7.00	1660	531	1,840	280
Ardèche	Vogüé	26.00	1.100	730	1100	1400	1600	1900	7.81	2200	890	1294	636
Ligne	Labeaume	2.07	0.002	170	300	390	480	-	4.14	622	162	586	112
Beaume	Saint-Alban-Auriolles	7.56	0.230	270	430	540	640	-	5.73	683	348	994	241
Chassezac	Chambonas	15.50	0.820	550	900	1100	1300	1600	-	1800	878	965	507
from Borne	Saint-Laurent-les-Bains	2.69	0.075	110	180	230	270	330	-	694	174	1357	63
from Altier	Altier	3.44	0.130	120	210	270	330	400	3.12	960	190	1056	103
Ardèche	Saint-Martin-d'Ardèche	64.30	2.700	1800	2600	3100	3600	4300	8.12	4500	2510	908	2,240

=== Voice server ===
The prefecture of Ardèche has provided a voice server since June 2005 whose objective is to regularly disseminate information messages to allow monitoring of any significant event that might trigger a civil security crisis or standby alert. Precise information on the evolution of any flood is provided.

=== Peculiarity ===
The Ardèche receives water from the Loire river via the "La Palisse" flood barrier and the Lake d'Issarlès. Effectively, the water is collected to feed the EDF hydroelectric plant at Montpezat-sous-Bauzon and is subsequently piped into the Fontaulière river, a tributary of the Ardèche, near the town of Aubenas.

== Hydronymy ==
Several ancient inscriptions about a college of nautes (Boatmen) in associated rivers have been discovered in the Gard. It is possible that the two rivers concerned are the Ardèche and the Ouvèze.

The identification of these two rivers is still pending. However, if it does involve the Ardèche river, the spellings Hentica (from 950), then Ardesca (in the Charta Vetus) have been attested.

== Protected areas ==
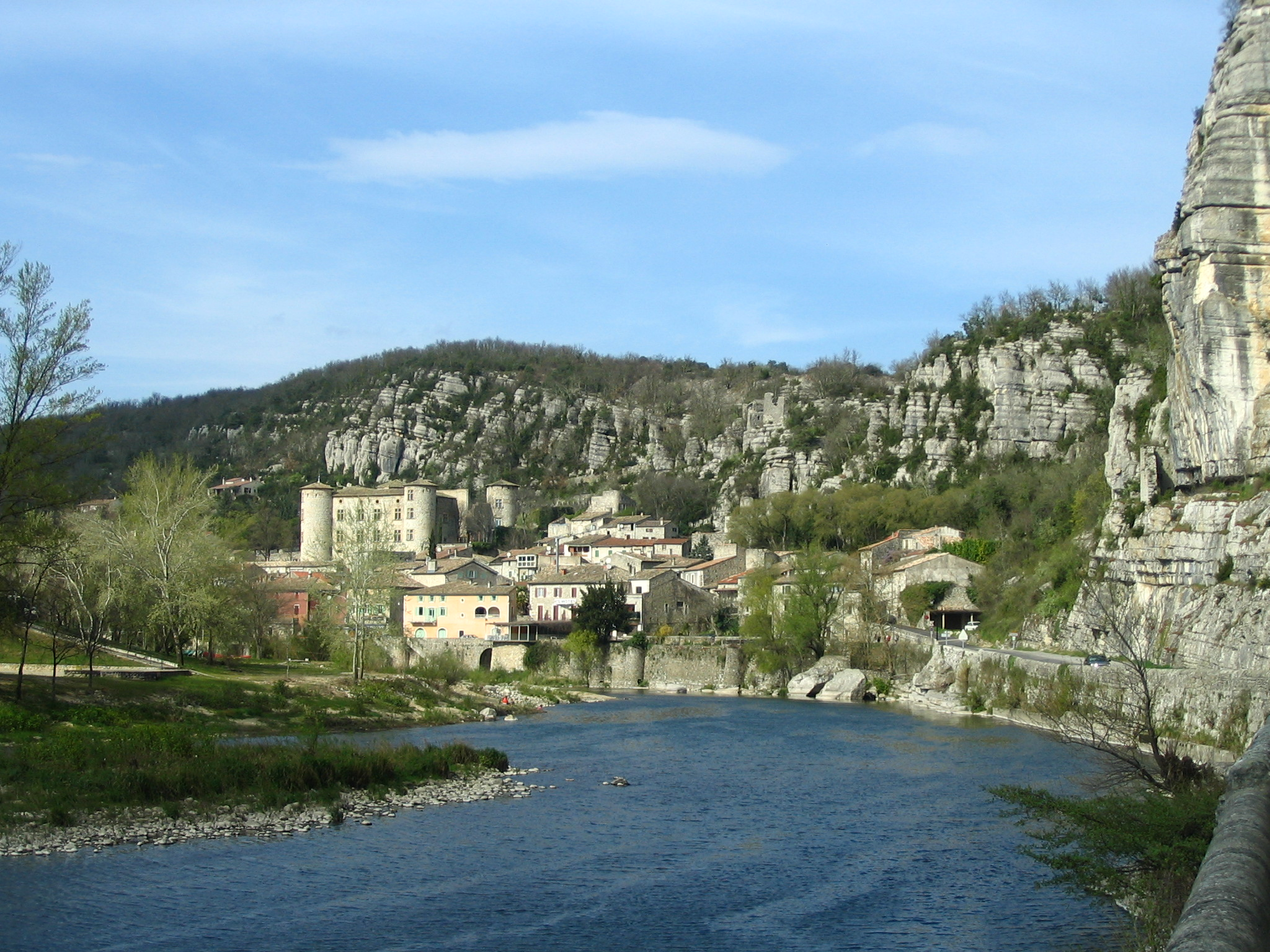
The Ardèche at Vogüé

Canoe tourism on the Ardeche

The Ardèche is protected along almost all of its course. These protected areas are:

- The sources of the Ardèche: Astet and Mayres, ZNIEFF type I
- The Upper valley of the Ardèche, between Thueyts and Ucel: ZNIEFF type I
- The Riparian forest and floodplain of the Ardèche, between Ucel and Vogüé: ZNIEFF type I
- The Middle Valley of the Ardèche and its Tributaries: Natura 2000 site
- The National Nature Reserve of the Gorges de l'Ardèche
- The lower valley of the Ardèche: ZNIEFF type I.

== Tourist attractions ==
- The Gorges de l'Ardèche - The Gorges de l'Ardèche (Ardèche Gorge) is located between the villages of Vallon-Pont-d'Arc and Saint-Martin-d'Ardèche. The road along the north rim of the gorge (the Corniche) has views into the gorge and over the river.
- Pont d'Arc (arched bridge) - A natural stone bridge across the river near the town of Vallon-Pont-d'Arc forms the natural to the Gorges de l'Ardèche.
- Chauvet Cave - This limestone cave, which is named after its discoverer, is in the Gorges de l'Ardèche. It contains early Stone Age cave paintings of great variety and expressiveness. Since the cave is not open to the public, photographs of cave paintings are displayed in an exhibition in Vallon-Pont d'Arc.

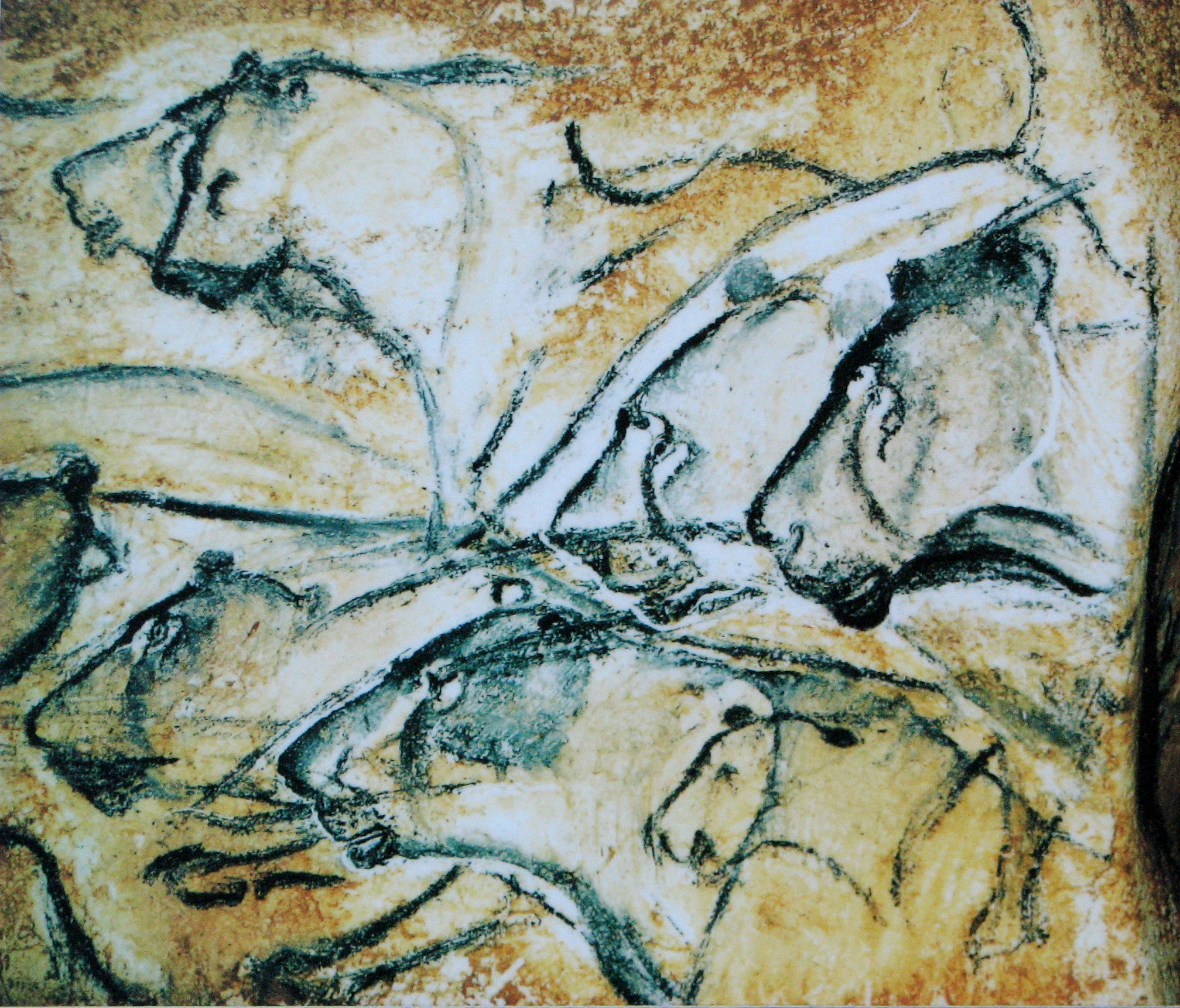
Lion paintings in the Chauvet cave
