= Château du Pin =

Château in Auvergne-Rhône-Alpes, France

Coordinates: 44°39′03″N 4°17′25″E

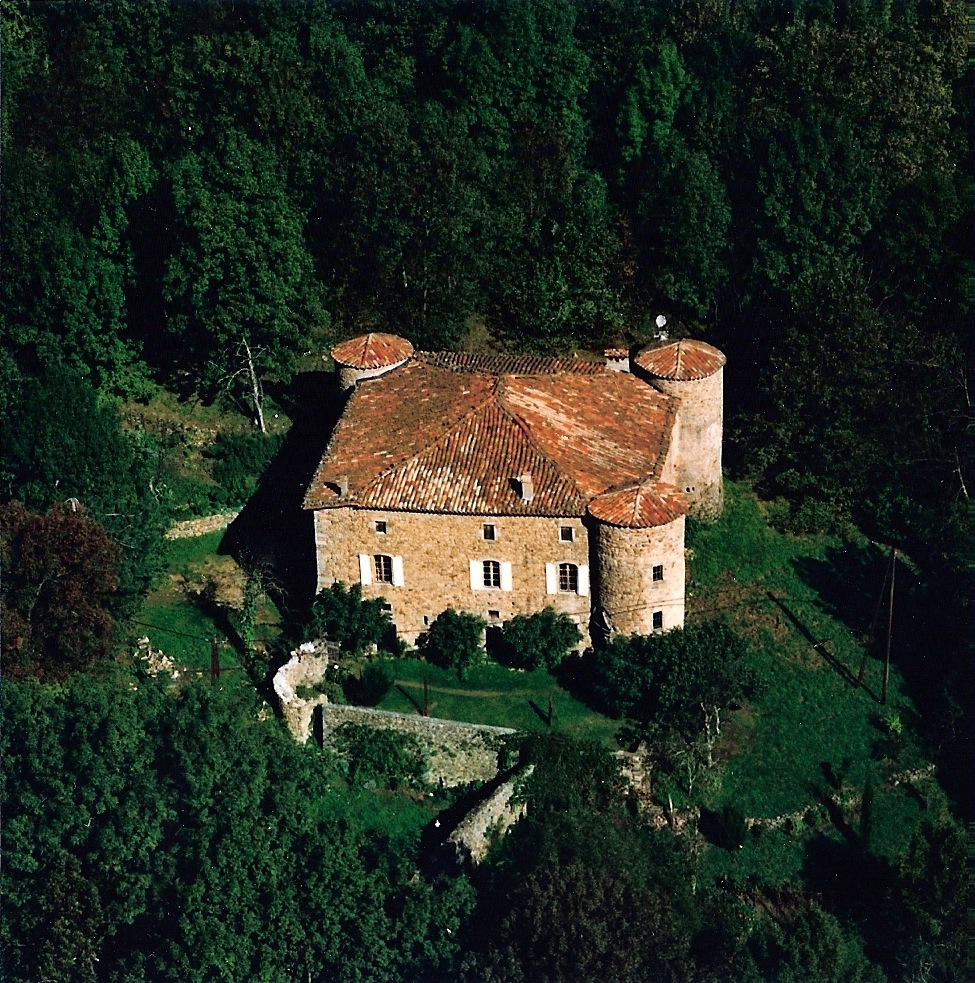
Château du Pin

The Château du Pin is a château in Fabras in Ardèche, southwestern France. It was built in the 12th century by the Chanaleilles family, then was heavily remodelled in the 16th century. The spot then acquired a dual function: military, with the addition of defensive towers, but also with agricultural crops in the field. The Château du Pin is typical of the fortified houses of Ardèche and the Cévennes. Built on a hillside, the castle is now surrounded by contemporary gardens, chestnut trees and dry stone terraces. The set is now a website dedicated to contemporary creation, open to the public since 1994 as a museum.

== History ==
Chanaleilles arms

The Chanaleilles, the founders of the château, were living there in the early 18th century. Their coat of arms, gold with three greyhounds, sand, gorged with the current money on each other, especially on a figure of the castle gates. The house was then sold to the family Gardon de Boulogne, then the abbot Labro, pastor of the village of Fabras. During the Revolution, Abbé Labro oath to the Republic and became Consul of the village. He was assassinated in his castle in 1802. The castle and its lands are then divided on a sale, before being reunited in the early 20th century by the family Boissin. Become a farm, the estate was bought in 1957 by Colette Bonzo painter (1917–1967) and her husband Dr. Elie Bontzolakis.

=== Architecture ===
Initial 12th century structures are visible only in the early 18th century a small guard tower and the foundations of rooms on the ground floor. In 1591, during the Wars of Religion, the building, built on three levels, is flanked by four towers at its center and topped with another round. A large loft and stables close the yard. Since the 18th century, there remain only three laps, the dovecote and stables were partially destroyed the contrary, the central tower was incorporated into the main building. The south facade is decorated with two beautiful doors:

- one, ogee (15th century), surmounted by the coats of arms and Chanaleilles Montlaur, opens on the former kitchen ( 1591–1592 ): barrel vault and wide arch chimney;
- another, from the Renaissance period, with pillars and pediment over from the ancient taste, opens on a tower with spiral staircase serving the ground floor and two floors.

On the ground floor, the old guard room (16th century), with cross-ribbed vaults, decorated with a large fireplace key. The first floor ceiling of the French, is furnished with antiques. A small tower, equipped with deadly vault keeps intersecting ribs.

=== Visits ===
Since 1994, the Château du Pin has been open to the public for part of the year. The site is primarily devoted to contemporary art: visual arts, performing arts, publishing found there, particularly in the context of "Summertime Château du Pin". It houses a permanent part of the work of Colette Bonzo and workshop Martine Diersé sculptor and ceramist.

== Castle gardens ==
=== History ===
Until 2001, the grounds surrounding the Château du Pin, including meadows, terraces, orchards, chestnut, part of the agricultural sector, are almost abandoned since 1957 . The two-washing basins are in poor condition, and pound canals destroyed in vaults collapsed. Moreover, nothing remains of the irrigation system of the late 18th century as described in the deed of 1802 . This act specifies in detail the watershed of 24 hours between the four new owners who purchase the domain.

=== Rehabilitation, 2001 ===
The gardens created by Martine Diersé in 2001 are open to visitors. The gardens combine contemporary sculptures and a large collection of old roses. Water scarcity has led to sometimes create a "dry garden" toward the stables burned the 16th century, down to the backyard . The walls survived the stables ending the garden. A hundred flowers on ceramic rods rebar are planted in clusters of seven on topics related to the body (head grinning, handprints, punches, forms recalling feet, bones) and forms more floral (bilaterally symmetrical, radial ...) on a base of pozzolan in a square surrounded by medicinal plants . Two large fig trees planted in Algeria in the years 1960 are preserved. The west wall is extended by a fence to protect the ceramic flower garden from the invasion of many deer and wild boars in the forests Ardèche . A grove of ash trees along the path to the castle houses female characters life-size terra cotta.

=== Extensions successive ===
In 2005, a source is found within the park, then captured and protected by a shell of concrete shell. It feeds the old wash house restored along which a fence is installed glazed stoneware. This reserve of water results in a reserve vault, also restored, allowing the watering of gardens below. Along the walls of this walled garden is planted in 2006 and hydrangeas, and camellias, climbing roses, small periwinkle ground cover, the acanthus, hostas, hearts-de-Marie. A second garden was created in the previous extension to the east, and a third north-east, always planting flowers, ceramics, wooden masts of chestnut trees hacked, incised, scarified and conducted numerous glycines fence and trees. The grafted plants bear sculptures characters partially glazed stoneware in the wisteria, and a head in a hackberry also appear in the successive extensions. A fourth garden grows on slopes since 2005, with iron structures of old roses planted, of clematis, boxwood, of yew and cypress . The roses include over 130 varieties since 2007 with the creation of a new garden. In 2009, the "dry garden" is replaced by a garden inspired by the miniatures of the Middle Ages . It includes a braiding of iron, a gazebo housing a seated figure in terra cotta, and roses such as Rosa gallica officinalis, Leda and Blush Damask, and an old vine vineyard . Since 2010, to spread the blooms this year, camellias and rhododendrons are installed in public areas and shady gardens.

=== Ranking remarkable garden ===
Gardens of Chateau du Pin bear the label assigned by the remarkable garden Ministry of Culture. By their presence in the typical landscape of terraces of the Ardèche Cévennes, the gardens are growing around the Chateau du Pin in a spirit of wild nature: planting roses botanical chosen for their foliage, fruit, their blooms smaller or exuberant.

== Cultural Activities ==
Like the castle, the gardens host with various artists such as professions represented in years: visual artists, dancers, musicians, glass, sculptors, photographers, architects, choreographers, musicians, actors and writers who have read the texts in public.

== Bibliography ==
- Collectif, Le livre des jardins du Pin, Éditions du Pin / Kallima éditeur, Fabras-Aizac, 2011;
- Martine Dumond, Les jardins du Pin, in Jardins insolites et remarquables de Rhône-Alpes, Editions Bonneton, Paris, 2011;
- Guylaine Magnier, Les jardins du château du Pin à Fabras (Ardèche), in le Cahier des Jardins n°6 Jardins, arts et artistes, URCAUE Rhône-Alpes, Lyon, 2010;
- Christian Bontzolakis, Les jardins du château du Pin à Fabras, Mémoire d'Ardèche et Temps Présent, n° 108, Jardins en Ardèche, espaces paysagers témoins de leur temps, 2010. Édition numérique : www.memoire-ardeche.com.

== Filmography ==
- IMDb : Une femme en bataille (Camille Brottes - 1993)
