= Vogüé =

Vogüé Vaugüer (Occitan)
- Commune
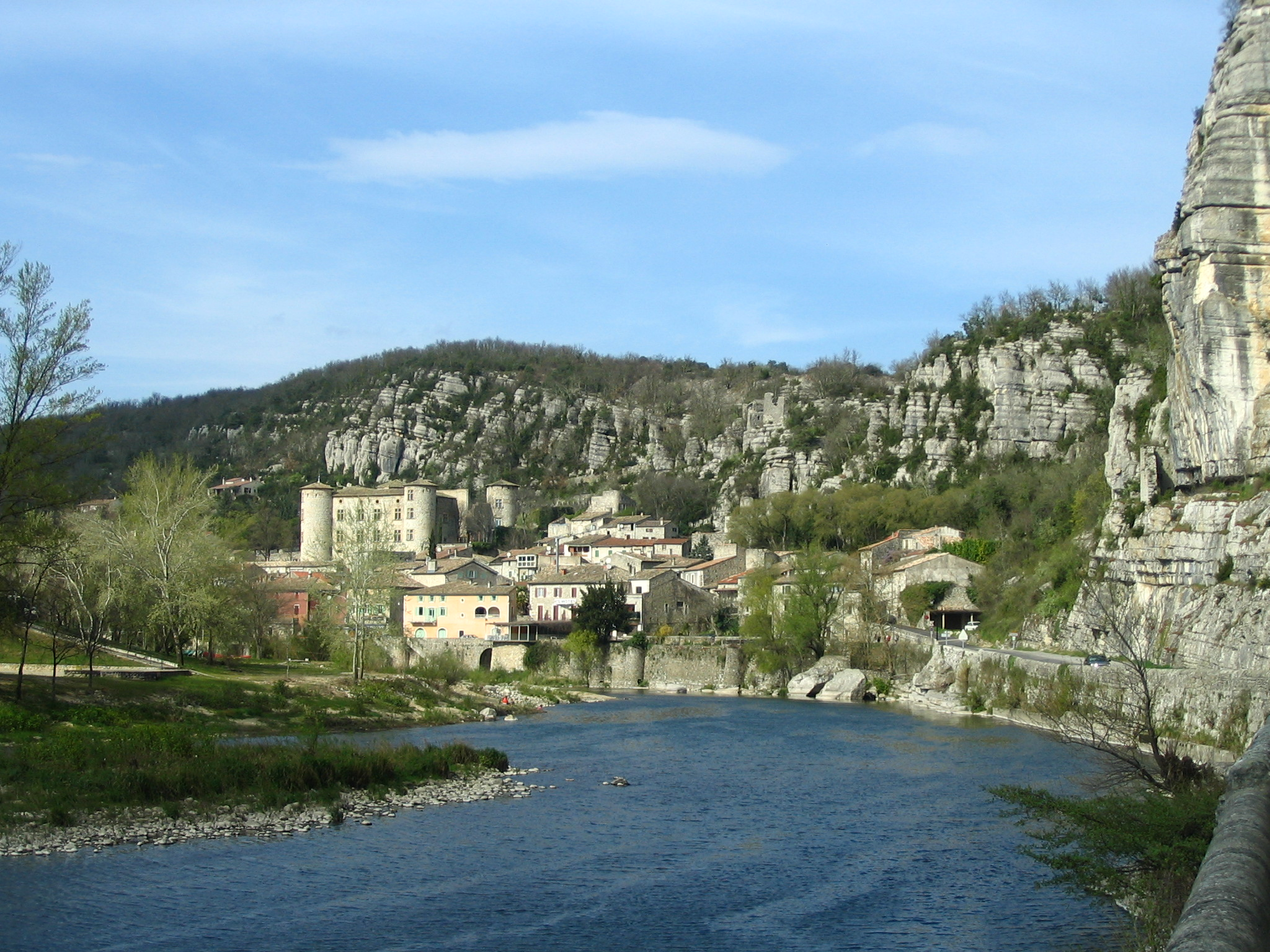
- View of Vogüé and the river Ardèche

- Coat of arms
- Location of Vogüé
- Location within France Location within Auvergne-Rhône-Alpes
- Coordinates: 44°33′05″N 4°24′55″E
- Country: France
- Region: Auvergne-Rhône-Alpes
- Department: Ardèche
- Arrondissement: Largentière
- Canton: Vallon-Pont-d'Arc
- Intercommunality: Gorges de l'Ardèche

Government
  - Mayor (2020–2026): Antoine Alberti
- Area^{1}: 11.72 km^{2} (4.53 sq mi)
- Elevation: 148 m (486 ft)
- Highest elevation: 342 m (1,122 ft)
- Lowest elevation: 140 m (460 ft)
- Population (2023): 1,040
  - Density: 88.7/km^{2} (230/sq mi)
- Time zone: UTC+01:00 (CET)
  - Summer (DST): UTC+02:00 (CEST)
- INSEE/Postal code: 07348 /07200
- ^{1} French Land Register data, which excludes lakes, ponds, glaciers > 1 km^{2} (0.386 sq mi or 247 acres) and river estuaries.

Vogüé (French pronunciation: [vɔɡɥe]; Occitan: Vaugüer) is a commune in the Ardèche department in southern France. It is a member of Les Plus Beaux Villages de France (The Most Beautiful Villages of France) Association.

== Geography ==
Vogüé is located along the banks of the river Ardèche.

== Population ==
Historical population
Year	Pop.	±% p.a.
1968	576	—
1975	546	−0.76%
1982	570	+0.62%
1990	631	+1.28%
1999	726	+1.57%
2007	886	+2.52%
2012	950	+1.40%
2017	1,087	+2.73%
2023	1,040	−0.73%
Source: INSEE

== See also ==
- Communes of the Ardèche department
