= Michel Kikoine =

Belarusian-French painter

Michel Kikoïne
- Born: 31 May 1892; Rechytsa, Russian Empire
- Died: 4 November 1968 (aged 76); Cannes, France
- Style: Expressionism
- Movement: Ecole de Paris

Michel Kikoïne (Belarusian: Міхаіл Кікоін; Russian: Михаил Кико́ин, Michail Kikóin; 31 May 1892 – 4 November 1968) was a Lithuanian Jewish-French painter who belonged to the Ecole de Paris art movement.

== Life ==
Kikoine was born in Rechytsa, present-day Belarus. The son of a Jewish banker in the small southeastern town of Gomel, he was barely into his teens when he began studying at "Kruger's School of Drawing" in Minsk. There he met Chaïm Soutine, with whom he had a lifelong friendship. At age 16, he and Soutine were studying at the Vilnius Academy of Art and in 1911 he moved to join the growing artistic community gathering in the Montparnasse quarter in Paris, France. This artistic community included his friend Soutine as well as fellow Belarus painter Pinchus Kremegne, who also had studied at the Fine Arts School in Vilnia. He enrolled in the École des Beaux-Arts in Cormon's studio.

For a time, the young artist lived at La Ruche while studying at the École nationale supérieure des Beaux-Arts. In 1914, he married a young lady from Vilnia with whom he had a daughter and a son. Their son, Jacques Yankel, born in France in 1920, also became a painter. The same year as his marriage, Kikoine volunteered to fight in the French army, serving until the end of World War I. His first solo exhibition took place in 1919 at the Chéron Gallery. Between 1922 and 1923, he and Soutine traveled to Céret and Cagnes-sur-Mer where, where, he painted Expressionist landscapes in influence of the light.

In 1926, Kikoine bought a house in Annay-sur-Serein in Burgundy. In 1927, he left La Ruche and settled in Montrouge, subsequently returning to Montparnasse in 1933. In 1939, Kikoine was mobilized and served in the military reserve near Soissons, where he painted gouaches of garrison life.

With the outbreak of World War II and the subsequent occupation of France by the Germans, Kikoine and his Jewish family faced deportation to the Nazi death camps. Until the end of the War they stayed near Toulouse. After the Allied liberation of France, he moved back to Paris where his paintings were primarily nudes, autoportraits, and portraits. He left the city rarely notably for a few visits to Israel, in a prominent visit in 1950, he participated in several exhibitions. In 1958, he moved to Cannes on the Mediterranean coast where he returned to landscape painting until his death on 4 November 1968.

== Career and style ==
Kikoine had his first exhibition in Paris in 1919 after which he exhibited regularly at the Salon d'Automne. His work was successful enough to provide a reasonable lifestyle for him and his family, allowing them to spend summers painting landscapes in the south of France, the most notable of which is his "Paysage Cezannien," inspired by Paul Cézanne. He died in Cannes.

During his time in Paris, he was friend and a contemporary of Chaim Soutine, Isaac Frenkel Frenel, Jules Pascin and other Jewish artist of the School Of Paris.

Kikoïne found great success in Paris. He went on to exhibit internationally across Europe and in New York. He also exhibited in Israel where he stayed for several months during the 1950s.

=== Style ===
Kikoïne desired not only to describe nature but also show the unmediated experience of one in nature. And showcase nature's passion and depth in the world. Kikoïne continued with the evolution of post-Impressionist painting whilst also expressing his own Jewish spirit, as is characteristic of the Ecole de Paris movement. It is said by that the expressionist language employed by Kikoïne (and similar to that of Soutine, Frenkel and other Jewish artists of the Ecole de Paris) was a manifestation of Jewish mysticism and the experience of Jewish existence. Furthermore, it is said his art also reflected the suffering of Eastern European Jewry as well as the anxiety of a foreigner far from home, experiences he related to deeply.

== Influence ==
In 2004, at the university in Tel Aviv, Israel, a new wing in the Genia Schreiber University Art Gallery was dedicated to the memory of Kikoine.

== See also ==
- Chaim Soutine
- Isaac Frenkel Frenel
- École nationale supérieure des Beaux-Arts
- Amadeo Modigliani
- School of Paris
- Expressionism
