= La Souche =

- Commune
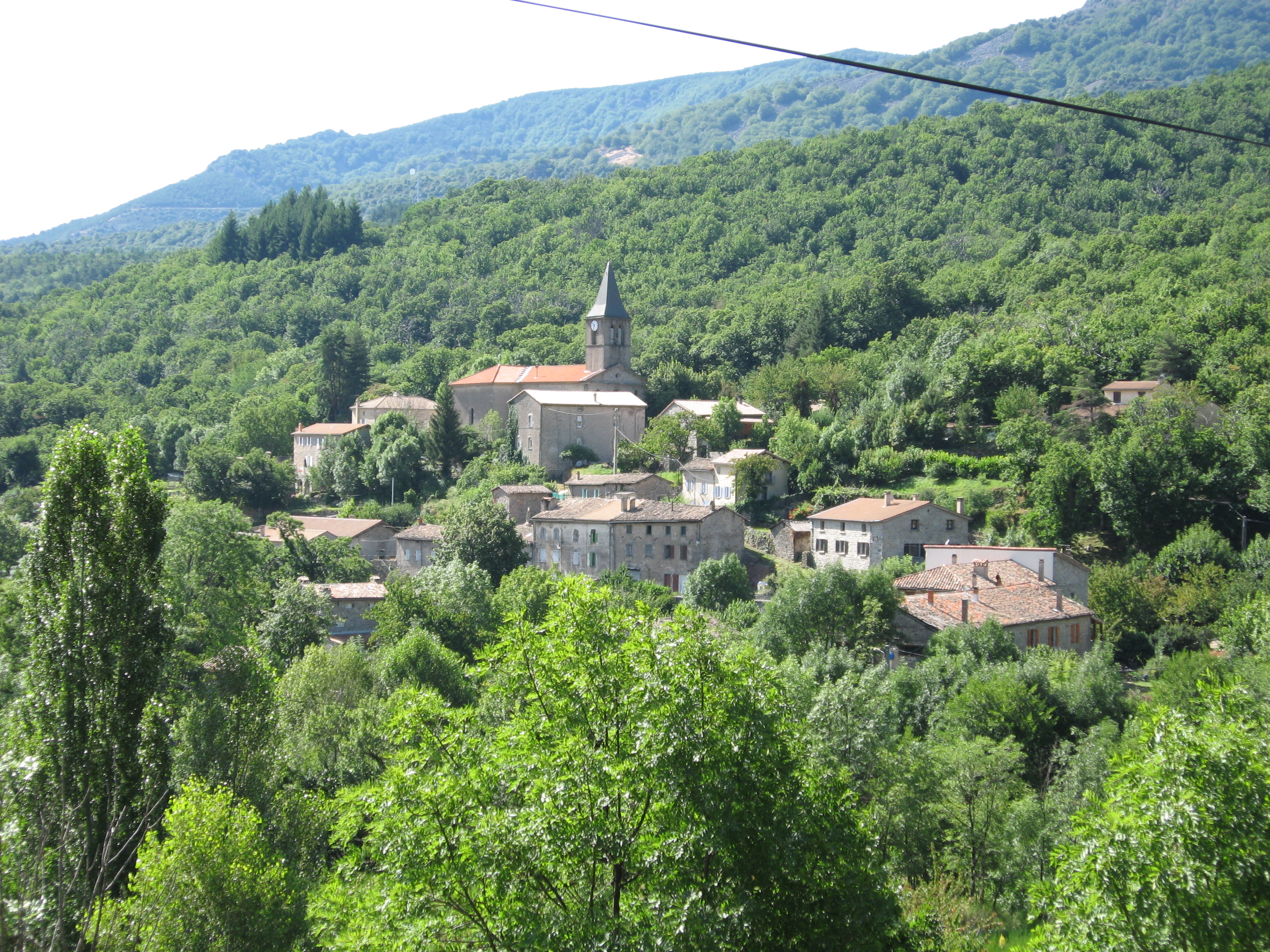
- The church and surrounding buildings in La Souche
- Location of La Souche
- Location within France Location within Auvergne-Rhône-Alpes
- Coordinates: 44°37′48″N 4°11′53″E
- Country: France
- Region: Auvergne-Rhône-Alpes
- Department: Ardèche
- Arrondissement: Largentière
- Canton: Haute-Ardèche

Government
  - Mayor (2020–2026): Jacques Geiguer
- Area^{1}: 31.52 km^{2} (12.17 sq mi)
- Elevation: 530 m (1,740 ft)
- Highest elevation: 1,498 m (4,915 ft)
- Lowest elevation: 463 m (1,519 ft)
- Population (2023): 385
  - Density: 12.2/km^{2} (31.6/sq mi)
- Time zone: UTC+01:00 (CET)
  - Summer (DST): UTC+02:00 (CEST)
- INSEE/Postal code: 07315 /07380
- ^{1} French Land Register data, which excludes lakes, ponds, glaciers > 1 km^{2} (0.386 sq mi or 247 acres) and river estuaries.

La Souche (French pronunciation: [la suʃ]; Occitan: La Socha) is a commune in the Ardèche department in southern France.

== Geography ==
The commune is located in the Parc naturel régional des Monts d'Ardèche 15 km (9.3 mi) east of Aubenas; its main hamlets are located on the right bank of the river Lignon, which rises in the commune's western part, then flows east through the commune.

== Population ==
Historical population
Year	Pop.	±% p.a.
1968	385	—
1975	334	−2.01%
1982	312	−0.97%
1990	288	−1.00%
1999	290	+0.08%
2007	332	+1.71%
2012	358	+1.52%
2017	370	+0.66%
2023	385	+0.66%
Source: INSEE

== See also ==
- Communes of the Ardèche department
