= Pont-de-Labeaume =

- Commune
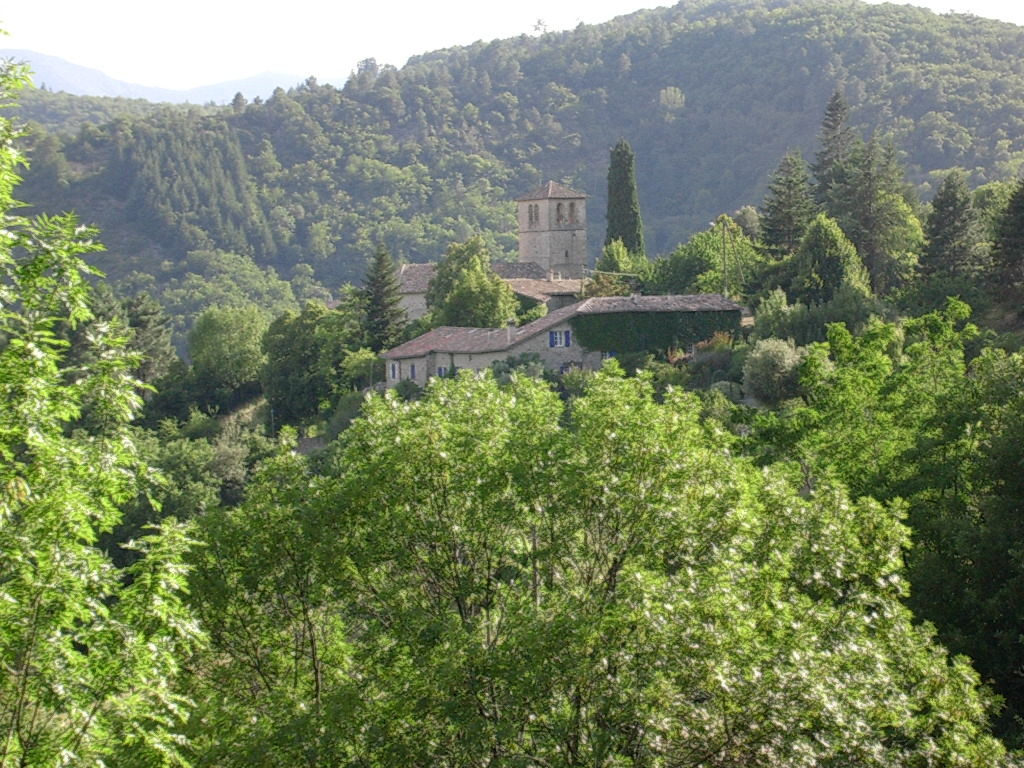
- The church of Niègles, in Pont-de-Labeaume
- Location of Pont-de-Labeaume
- Location within France Location within Auvergne-Rhône-Alpes
- Coordinates: 44°40′00″N 4°17′23″E
- Country: France
- Region: Auvergne-Rhône-Alpes
- Department: Ardèche
- Arrondissement: Largentière
- Canton: Haute-Ardèche

Government
  - Mayor (2020–2026): Yves Veyrenc
- Area^{1}: 4.66 km^{2} (1.80 sq mi)
- Elevation: 304 m (997 ft)
- Highest elevation: 586 m (1,923 ft)
- Lowest elevation: 256 m (840 ft)
- Population (2023): 567
  - Density: 122/km^{2} (315/sq mi)
- Time zone: UTC+01:00 (CET)
  - Summer (DST): UTC+02:00 (CEST)
- INSEE/Postal code: 07178 /07380
- ^{1} French Land Register data, which excludes lakes, ponds, glaciers > 1 km^{2} (0.386 sq mi or 247 acres) and river estuaries.

Pont-de-Labeaume (French pronunciation: [pɔ̃ də labom]; Occitan: Pònt de La Bauma) is a commune in the Ardèche department in southern France.

== Geography ==
The river Lignon forms small part of the commune's western border, then joins the Ardèche, which flows east through the commune.

The village is located in the western part of the commune, on the right bank of the Ardèche.

== Population ==
Historical population
Year	Pop.	±% p.a.
1968	532	—
1975	545	+0.35%
1982	529	−0.42%
1990	517	−0.29%
1999	485	−0.71%
2007	561	+1.84%
2012	578	+0.60%
2017	571	−0.24%
2023	567	−0.12%
Source: INSEE

== See also ==
- Communes of the Ardèche department
