= Lignon (Ardèche) =

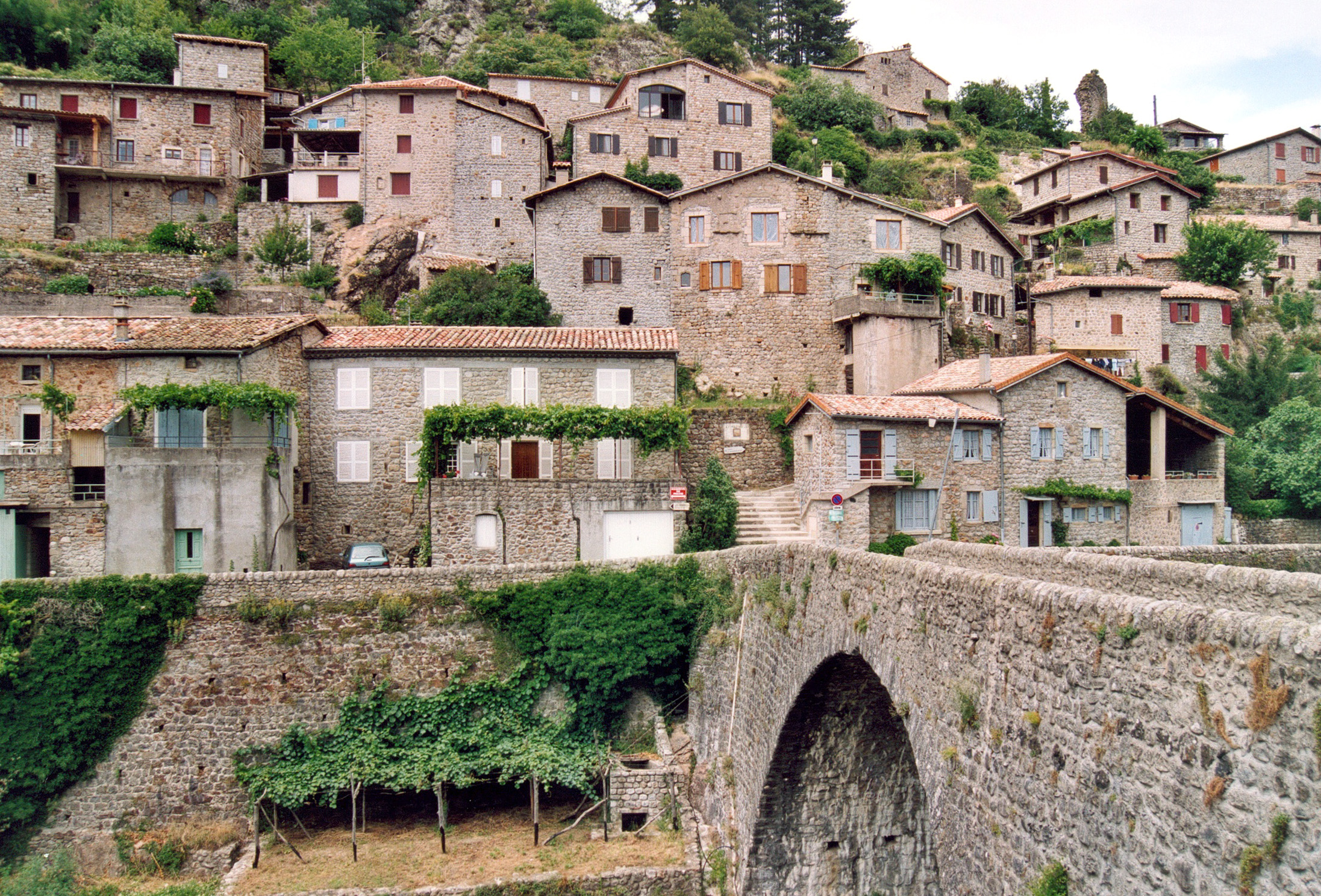
- A bridge over the Lignon at Jaujac.

- Location within France Location within Auvergne-Rhône-Alpes

Location
- Country: France

Physical characteristics
- Source
  - location: La Souche
  - coordinates: 44°37′46″N 04°05′27″E
  - elevation: 1,360 m (4,460 ft)
- Mouth
  - location: Ardèche
  - coordinates: 44°40′04″N 04°16′34″E
  - elevation: 308 m (1,010 ft)
- Length: 20.7 km (12.9 mi)

Basin features
- Progression: Ardèche→ Rhône→ Mediterranean Sea

The Lignon (French pronunciation: [liɲɔ̃]) is a 20.7 km (12.9 mi) long river in the Ardèche département, southern France. Its source is at La Souche, in the Parc naturel régional des Monts d'Ardèche. It flows generally east-northeast. It is a right tributary of the Ardèche into which it flows between Meyras and Pont-de-Labeaume.

== Communes along its course ==
This list is ordered from source to mouth:

- Ardèche: La Souche, Jaujac, Fabras, Meyras, Pont-de-Labeaume
