= Pinchus Kremegne =

Belarusian-French artist

Pinchus Krémègne
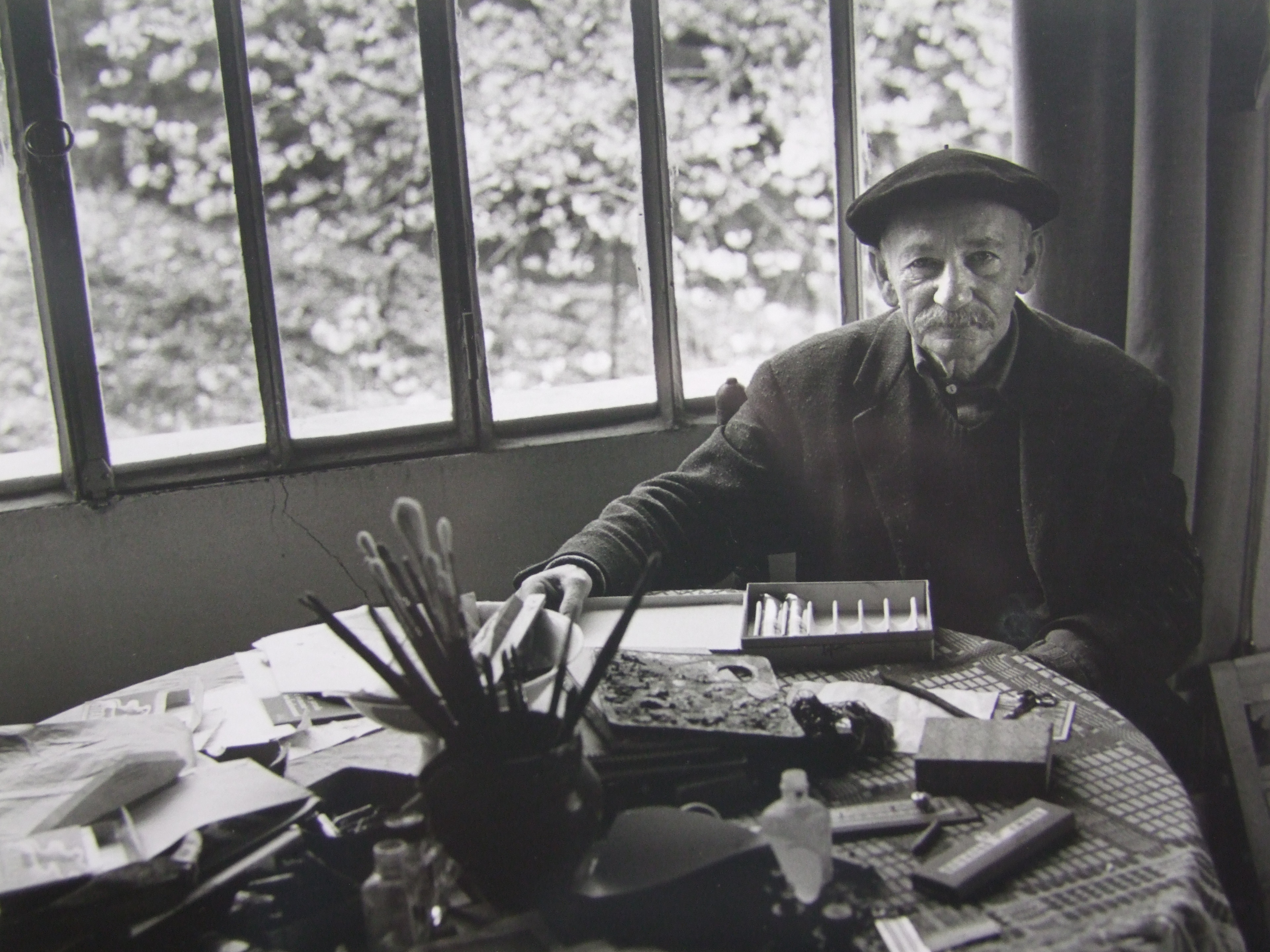
- Pinchus Krémègne in 1963
- Born: 28 July 1890
- Died: 5 April 1981 (aged 90)
- Known for: Painting, Sculpture
- Movement: Ecole de Paris

Pinchus Krémègne, aka Pinchus Kremegne (Hebrew: פנחס קרמין; Russian: Пинхус Кремень; 28 July 1890 – 5 April 1981), was a Lithuanian Belarusian Jewish-French artist, primarily known as a sculptor, painter and lithographer.

== Biography and Art ==
He was a native of Zhaludak near Lida, now Belarus, and was a friend of both Chaïm Soutine and Michel Kikoine. He studied sculpture at the Vilnius Academy of Art. He became a target of the pogroms because he was a Jew and fled to Paris in 1912. In Paris, Krémègne joined the group of painters of Montparnasse and soon became one of the respected residents of La Ruche. In 1915, he gave up sculpture in order to dedicate himself to painting. It was he who encouraged Soutine to come to Paris. In Montparnasse he met several other prominent Jewish painters of the School of Paris including Isaac Frenkel and Michel Kikoine.

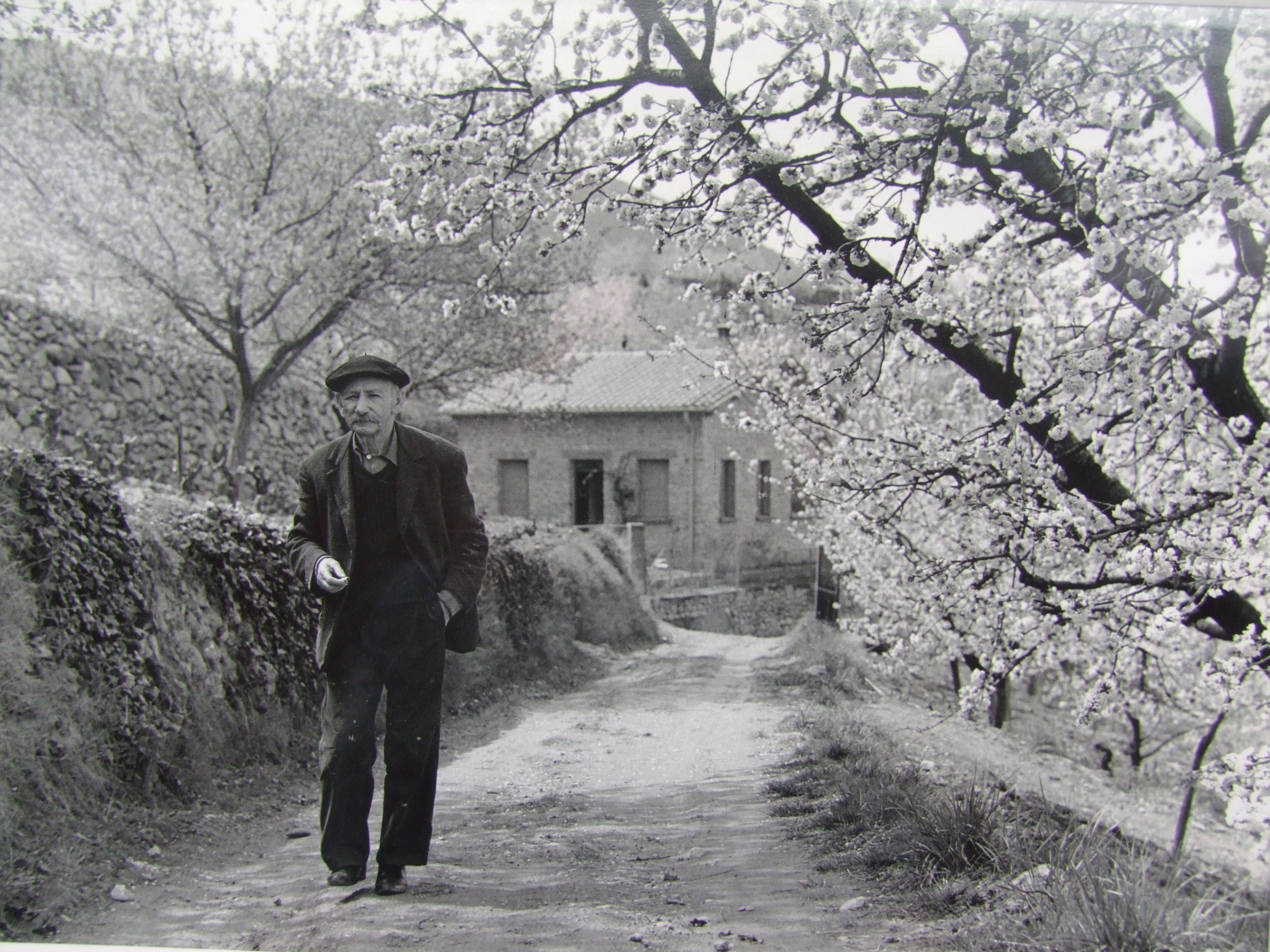
Krémègne in front of his house in Ceret, 1963.

He left Paris to live in a small town in the Pyrenees called Ceret. This village, which is a little inland from Collioure, attracted other painters such as Soutine. Although Soutine did not like the town very much, he completed many paintings there over a couple of years. He never settled but his compatriot Krémègne had a house built there around 1960. This small unassuming house, a reflection of the man himself, is nestled into the mountain and overlooks the village.

There was a falling out between the two men perhaps stemming from some ingratitude shown by Soutine towards a mutual 'mecene' or benefactor who had helped out the two impoverished artists during their early careers in Paris. Krémègne's house has new occupants and it is called La Miranda del Convent. Later Ceret was to attract other painters such as Picasso. The Picasso walk meanders by Krémègne's house and Ceret has an important museum exhibiting artists such as Matisse, Picasso, and others. There are a few Krémègne paintings on exhibition there as well.

Krémègne died in Ceret.

== Legacy ==
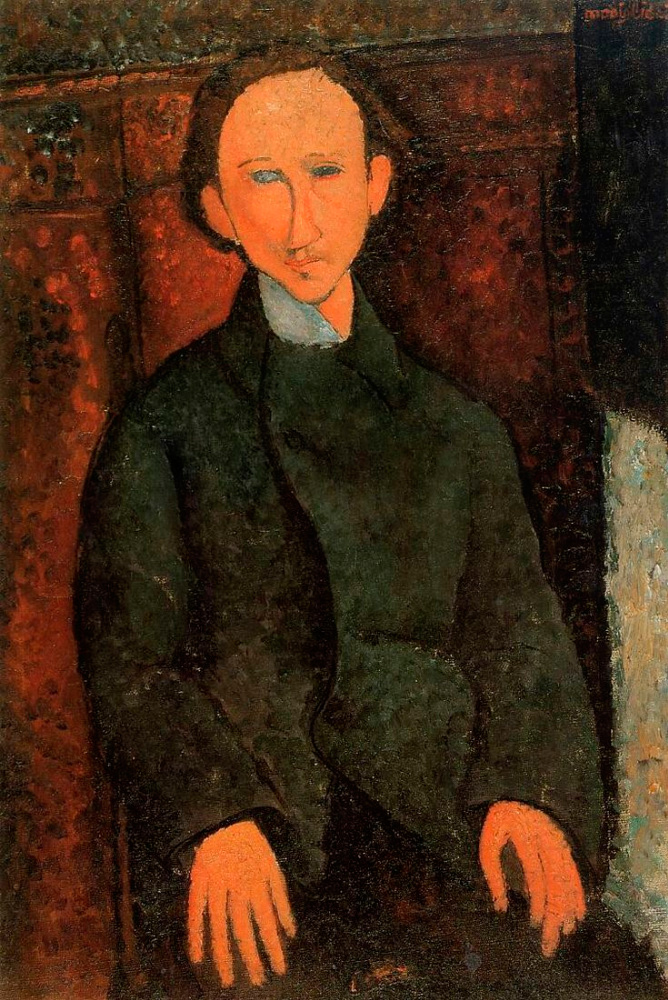
Amedeo Modigliani, Le peintre Kremegne, 1916, Museum of Fine Arts Bern.

Not highly esteemed as an artist today, he is overshadowed by Soutine and Chagall. He was remembered with a posthumous one-man show in the Quartier Les Halles in Paris in the 1990s. A more structured vision of nature than Soutine's, Krémègne's last paintings prefigure the work of painters such as Leon Kossoff and Frank Auerbach in England.

== Selected works in public collections ==
In France

- Béziers, Museum of Fine Arts, Nude Blonde (the painter's wife), oil on canvas.
- Céret, Museum of Modern Art, four drawings, ten oil paintings including The Studio and The Entrance of the Capuchins, donation by Pinchus Krémègne.
- Cosne-Cours-sur-Loire, Loire Museum, Maquis, View of Céret, Landscape near Céret, oil on canvas.
- Granville, Richard-Anacréon Museum of Modern Art, Landscape, oil on canvas.
- Grenoble, Grenoble Museum, Basket of Fish, oil on canvas.
- L'Isle-Adam, Museum of Art and History Louis-Senlecq, Village, print.
- Paris, Museum of Jewish Art and History, Portrait of a Woman, oil on canvas, around 1930.
- Toulouse, Augustins Museum, Landscape, around 1944, The Dining Room, before 1948, oil on canvas.
- Troyes, Museum of Modern Art, Still Life, oil on canvas, donation by Pierre Lévy.

In UK

- Cardiff, National Museum, Houses in Corsica, oil on canvas, donation by Gwendoline and Margaret Davies.
