= Saint-Alban-Auriolles =

- Commune
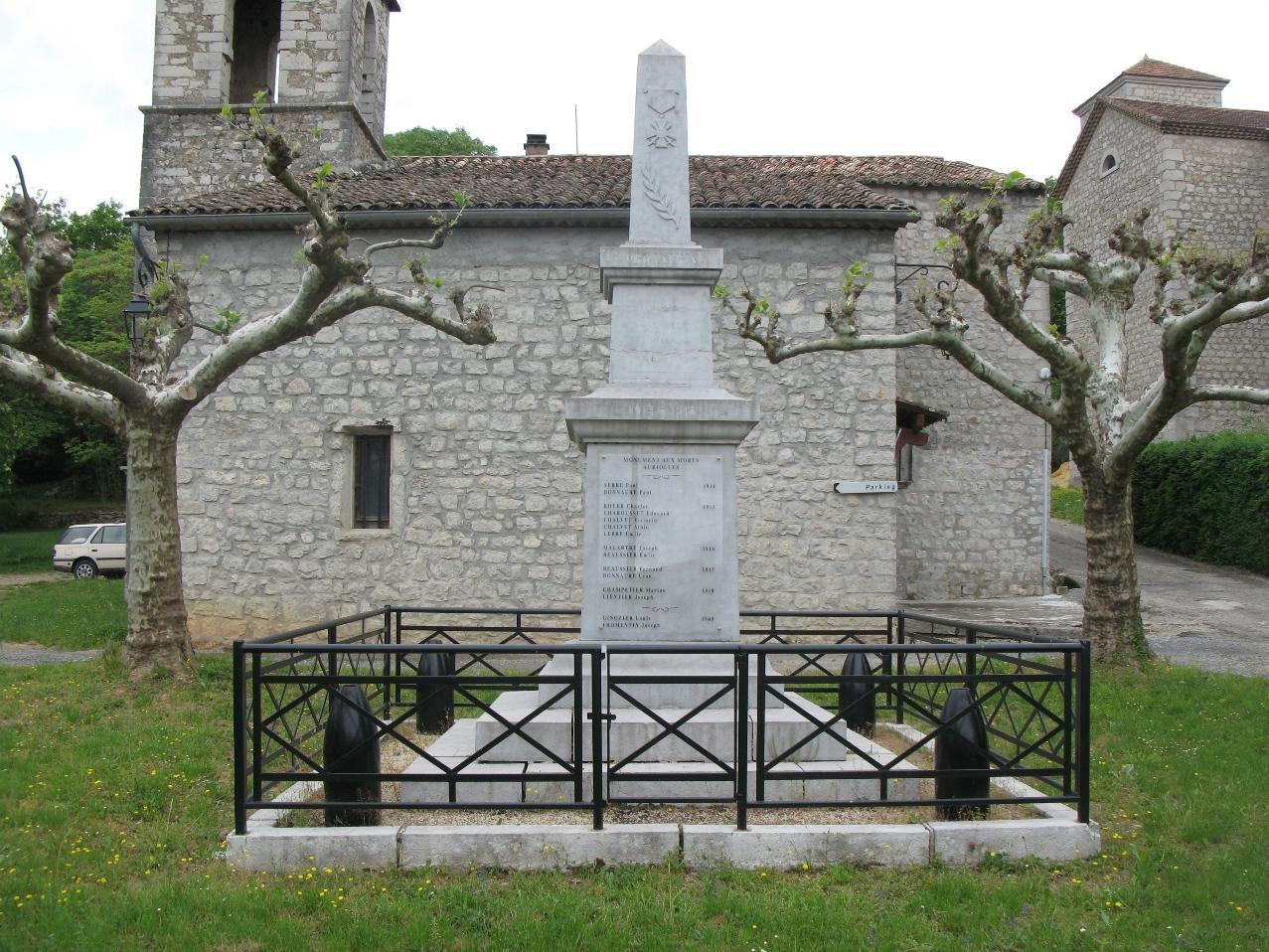
- The war memorial in Auriolles
- Location of Saint-Alban-Auriolles
- Location within France Location within Auvergne-Rhône-Alpes
- Coordinates: 44°25′37″N 4°17′59″E
- Country: France
- Region: Auvergne-Rhône-Alpes
- Department: Ardèche
- Arrondissement: Largentière
- Canton: Vallon-Pont-d'Arc

Government
  - Mayor (2020–2026): Nicolas Clement
- Area^{1}: 17.57 km^{2} (6.78 sq mi)
- Elevation: 108 m (354 ft)
- Highest elevation: 254 m (833 ft)
- Lowest elevation: 92 m (302 ft)
- Population (2023): 1,138
  - Density: 64.77/km^{2} (167.8/sq mi)
- Time zone: UTC+01:00 (CET)
  - Summer (DST): UTC+02:00 (CEST)
- INSEE/Postal code: 07207 /07120
- ^{1} French Land Register data, which excludes lakes, ponds, glaciers > 1 km^{2} (0.386 sq mi or 247 acres) and river estuaries.

Saint-Alban-Auriolles (French pronunciation: [sɛ̃.t‿albɑ̃ oʁjɔl]; Occitan: Sant Auban e Auriòlas) is a commune in the Ardèche department in southern France.

== Geography ==
The river Chassezac flows into the Ardèche in the commune.

== Population ==
Historical population
| Year | Pop. | ±% p.a. |
|---|---|---|
| 1968 | 504 | — |
| 1975 | 513 | +0.25% |
| 1982 | 542 | +0.79% |
| 1990 | 584 | +0.94% |
| 1999 | 736 | +2.60% |
| 2007 | 909 | +2.67% |
| 2012 | 1,026 | +2.45% |
| 2017 | 1,091 | +1.24% |
| 2023 | 1,138 | +0.71% |
Source: INSEE

== See also ==
- Communes of the Ardèche department
