= Château de Tournon =

Coordinates: 45.0683°N 4.8318°E

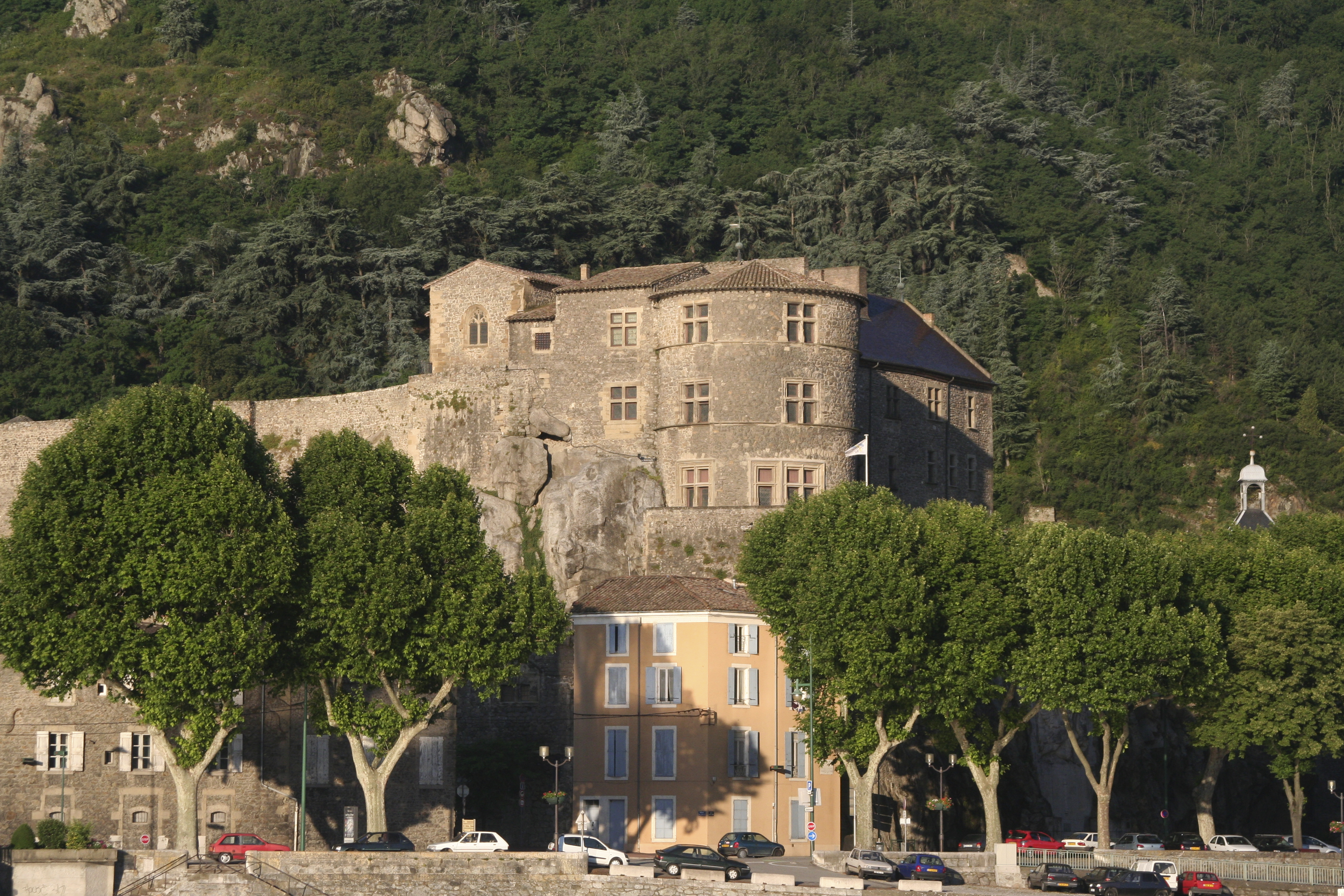
- The castle in 2008
- Interactive map of the Château de Tournon area

General information
- Type: castle
- Location: Tournon-sur-Rhône, France
- Completed: 16th century

The Château de Tournon is a listed castle in Tournon-sur-Rhône, Ardèche, France. It was built in the 16th century. It has been listed as an official historical monument since July 1926.
