= Fabras =

- Commune
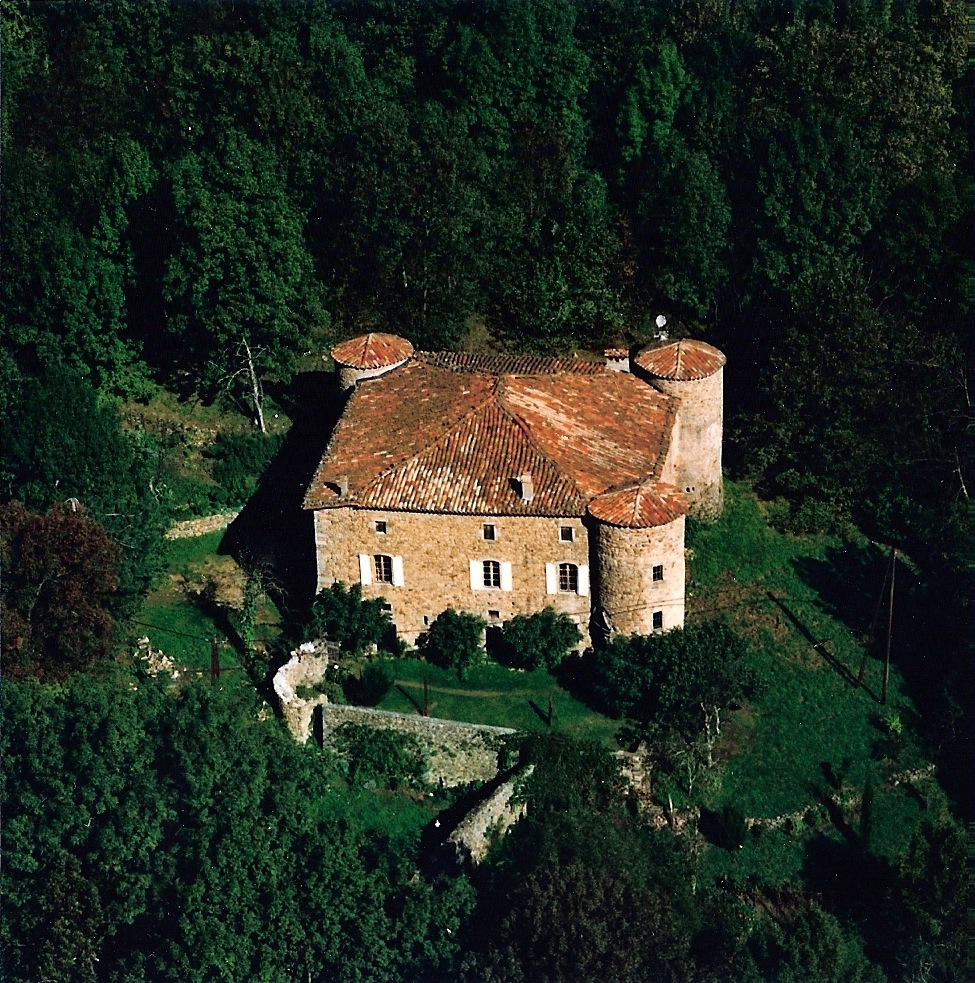
- The chateau in Fabras
- Location of Fabras
- Location within France Location within Auvergne-Rhône-Alpes
- Coordinates: 44°39′03″N 4°17′25″E
- Country: France
- Region: Auvergne-Rhône-Alpes
- Department: Ardèche
- Arrondissement: Largentière
- Canton: Haute-Ardèche
- Intercommunality: Ardèche des Sources et Volcans

Government
  - Mayor (2020–2026): Cédric d'Imperio
- Area^{1}: 7.52 km^{2} (2.90 sq mi)
- Elevation: 450 m (1,480 ft)
- Highest elevation: 607 m (1,991 ft)
- Lowest elevation: 279 m (915 ft)
- Population (2023): 467
  - Density: 62.1/km^{2} (161/sq mi)
- Time zone: UTC+01:00 (CET)
  - Summer (DST): UTC+02:00 (CEST)
- INSEE/Postal code: 07087 /07380
- ^{1} French Land Register data, which excludes lakes, ponds, glaciers > 1 km^{2} (0.386 sq mi or 247 acres) and river estuaries.

Fabras (French pronunciation: [fabʁas]; Occitan: Fabràs) is a commune in the Ardèche department in southern France.

== Geography ==
The river Lignon forms all of the commune's western border; the river Ardèche forms small part of its northeastern border.

== Population ==
Historical population
Year	Pop.	±% p.a.
1968	188	—
1975	185	−0.23%
1982	214	+2.10%
1990	265	+2.71%
1999	276	+0.45%
2007	348	+2.94%
2012	389	+2.25%
2017	410	+1.06%
2023	467	+2.19%
Source: INSEE

== Personalities ==
Colette Bonzo (1917–1967): expressionist painter who exhibited in Paris, in the provinces and abroad. She worked mainly in Paris and bought the Château du Pin in 1957. She is buried in the cemetery of Fabras. Some of his works are presented to the public at the Chateau du Pin.

== See also ==
- Communes of the Ardèche department
