= Ucel =

- Commune
- Location of Ucel
- Location within France Location within Auvergne-Rhône-Alpes
- Coordinates: 44°37′39″N 4°23′48″E
- Country: France
- Region: Auvergne-Rhône-Alpes
- Department: Ardèche
- Arrondissement: Largentière
- Canton: Aubenas-1
- Intercommunality: Bassin d'Aubenas

Government
  - Mayor (2020–2026): Marc Souteyrand
- Area^{1}: 5.54 km^{2} (2.14 sq mi)
- Elevation: 220 m (720 ft)
- Highest elevation: 456 m (1,496 ft)
- Lowest elevation: 197 m (646 ft)
- Population (2023): 2,019
  - Density: 364/km^{2} (944/sq mi)
- Time zone: UTC+01:00 (CET)
  - Summer (DST): UTC+02:00 (CEST)
- INSEE/Postal code: 07325 /07200
- ^{1} French Land Register data, which excludes lakes, ponds, glaciers > 1 km^{2} (0.386 sq mi or 247 acres) and river estuaries.

Ucel (French pronunciation: [ysɛl]; Occitan: Ucèl) is a commune in the Ardèche department in southern France.

== Population ==
Historical population
Year	Pop.	±% p.a.
1968	1,163	—
1975	1,395	+2.63%
1982	1,719	+3.03%
1990	1,677	−0.31%
1999	1,750	+0.47%
2007	1,891	+0.97%
2012	2,032	+1.45%
2017	2,043	+0.11%
2023	2,019	−0.20%
Source: INSEE

== See also ==
- Communes of the Ardèche department
