= Meyras =

- Commune
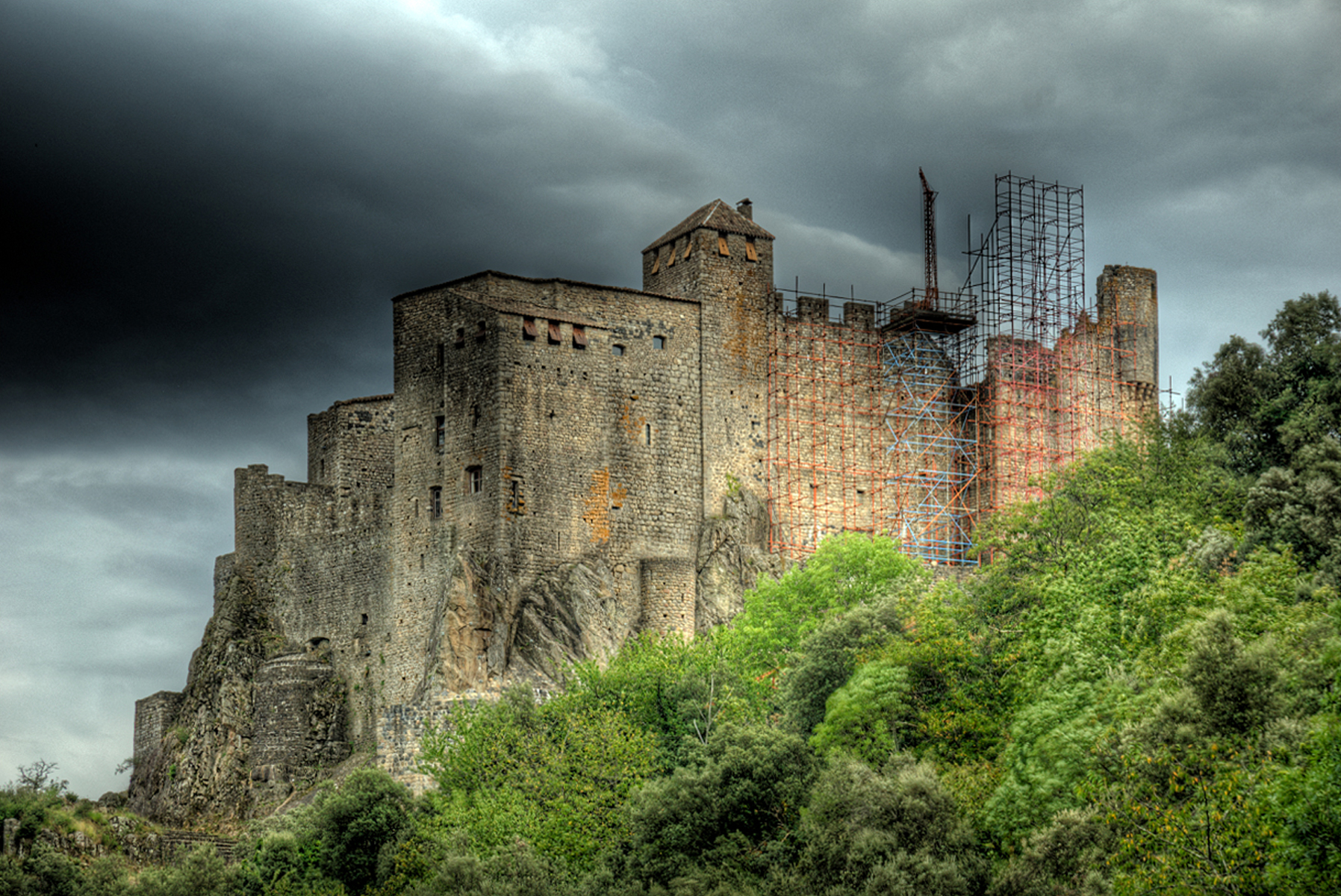
- Chateau of Ventadour

- Coat of arms
- Location of Meyras
- Location within France Location within Auvergne-Rhône-Alpes
- Coordinates: 44°40′57″N 4°16′05″E
- Country: France
- Region: Auvergne-Rhône-Alpes
- Department: Ardèche
- Arrondissement: Largentière
- Canton: Haute-Ardèche

Government
  - Mayor (2020–2026): Karine Robert
- Area^{1}: 12.31 km^{2} (4.75 sq mi)
- Elevation: 370 m (1,210 ft)
- Highest elevation: 880 m (2,890 ft)
- Lowest elevation: 298 m (978 ft)
- Population (2023): 889
  - Density: 72.2/km^{2} (187/sq mi)
- Time zone: UTC+01:00 (CET)
  - Summer (DST): UTC+02:00 (CEST)
- INSEE/Postal code: 07156 /07380
- ^{1} French Land Register data, which excludes lakes, ponds, glaciers > 1 km^{2} (0.386 sq mi or 247 acres) and river estuaries.

Meyras (French pronunciation: [mɛʁas]; Occitan: Mairàs) is a commune in the Ardèche department in southern France.

== Geography ==
The river Lignon forms part of the commune's southeastern border, then joins the Ardèche, which flows east through the commune.

== Population ==
Historical population
Year	Pop.	±% p.a.
1968	798	—
1975	764	−0.62%
1982	713	−0.98%
1990	729	+0.28%
1999	775	+0.68%
2007	825	+0.78%
2012	913	+2.05%
2017	938	+0.54%
2023	889	−0.89%
Source: INSEE

== See also ==
- Communes of the Ardèche department
