= Mayres, Ardèche =

Mayres
- Commune
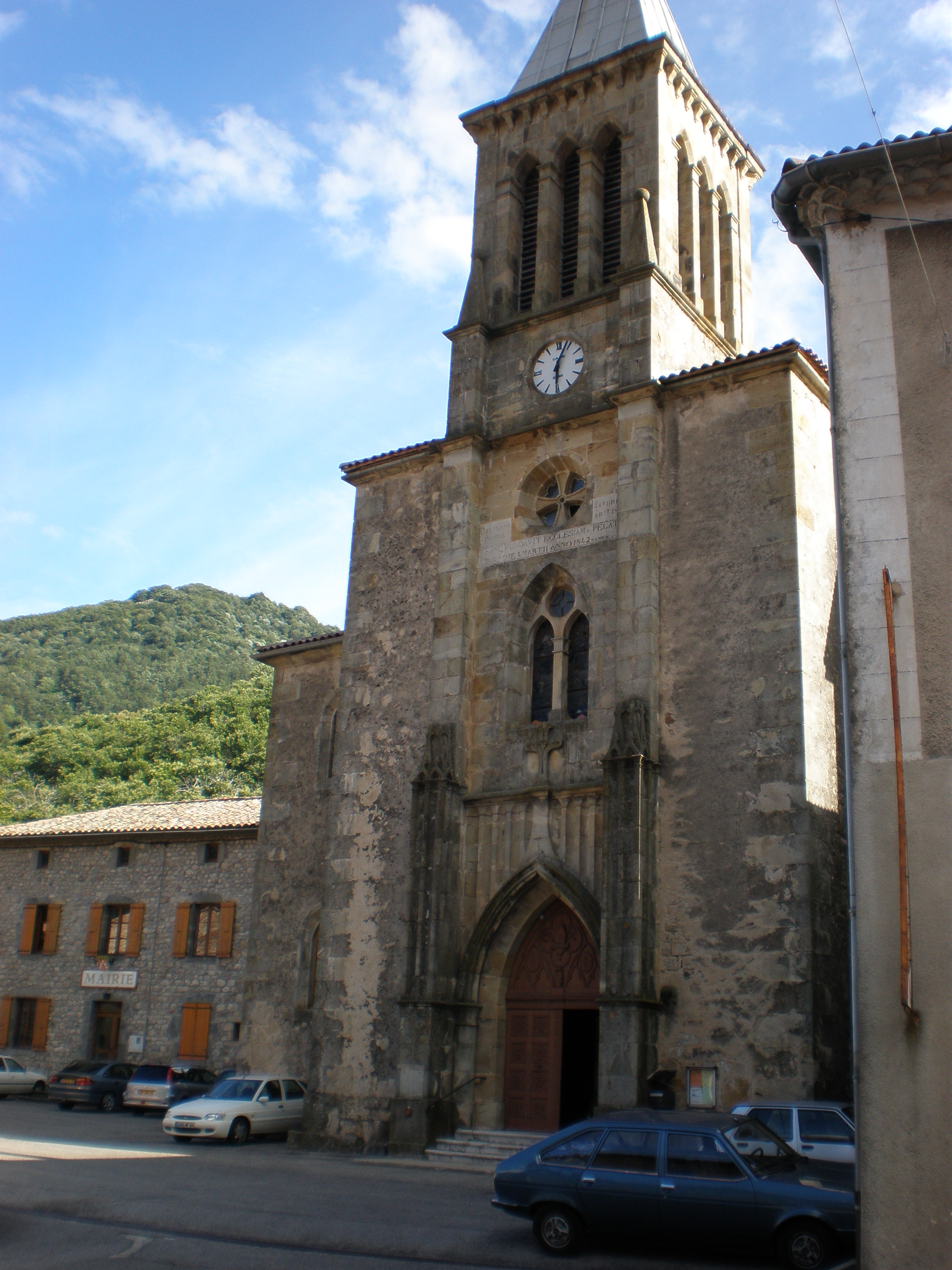
- The church in Mayres

- Coat of arms
- Location of Mayres
- Location within France Location within Auvergne-Rhône-Alpes
- Coordinates: 44°39′59″N 4°06′54″E
- Country: France
- Region: Auvergne-Rhône-Alpes
- Department: Ardèche
- Arrondissement: Largentière
- Canton: Haute-Ardèche

Government
  - Mayor (2020–2026): Guy Laurent
- Area^{1}: 30.07 km^{2} (11.61 sq mi)
- Elevation: 575 m (1,886 ft)
- Highest elevation: 1,533 m (5,030 ft)
- Lowest elevation: 499 m (1,637 ft)
- Population (2023): 262
  - Density: 8.71/km^{2} (22.6/sq mi)
- Time zone: UTC+01:00 (CET)
  - Summer (DST): UTC+02:00 (CEST)
- INSEE/Postal code: 07153 /07330
- ^{1} French Land Register data, which excludes lakes, ponds, glaciers > 1 km^{2} (0.386 sq mi or 247 acres) and river estuaries.

Mayres (French pronunciation: [mɛʁ]; Occitan: Maires) is a commune in the Ardèche department in southern France.

== Population ==
Historical population
Year	Pop.	±% p.a.
1968	445	—
1975	409	−1.20%
1982	366	−1.57%
1990	302	−2.37%
1999	258	−1.73%
2007	257	−0.05%
2012	265	+0.61%
2017	262	−0.23%
2023	262	+0.00%
Source: INSEE

== See also ==
- Communes of the Ardèche department
