= Annay-sur-Serein =

- Commune
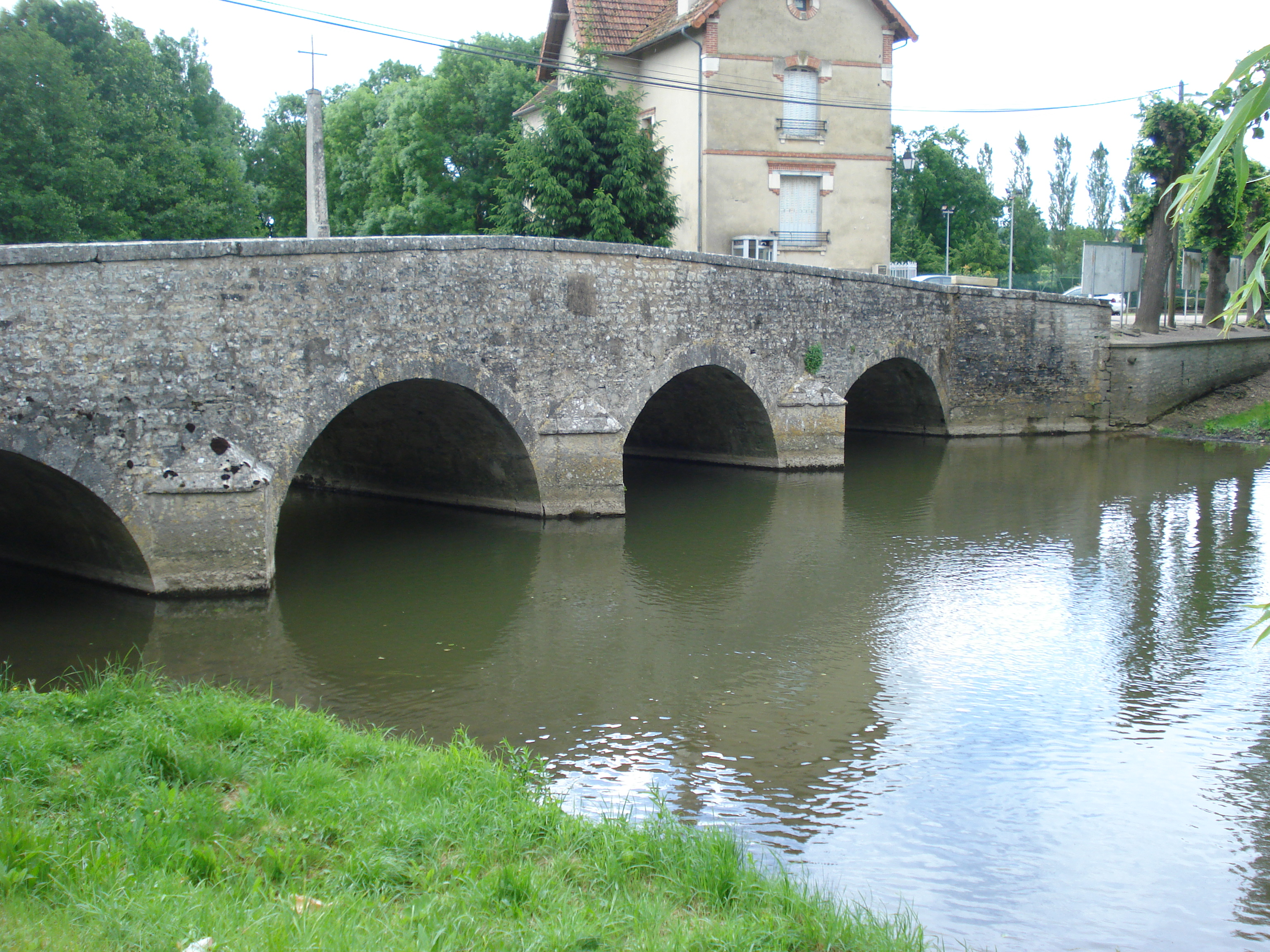
- The Serein bridge in Annay-sur-Serein
- Location of Annay-sur-Serein
- Location within France Location within Bourgogne-Franche-Comté
- Coordinates: 47°43′48″N 3°57′38″E
- Country: France
- Region: Bourgogne-Franche-Comté
- Department: Yonne
- Arrondissement: Avallon
- Canton: Chablis

Government
  - Mayor (2020–2026): Jean-Marie Maurice
- Area^{1}: 27.00 km^{2} (10.42 sq mi)
- Highest elevation: 278 m (912 ft)
- Lowest elevation: 161 m (528 ft)
- Population (2023): 205
  - Density: 7.59/km^{2} (19.7/sq mi)
- Time zone: UTC+01:00 (CET)
  - Summer (DST): UTC+02:00 (CEST)
- INSEE/Postal code: 89010 /89310
- ^{1} French Land Register data, which excludes lakes, ponds, glaciers > 1 km^{2} (0.386 sq mi or 247 acres) and river estuaries.

Annay-sur-Serein (French pronunciation: [anɛ syʁ səʁɛ̃], literally Annay on Serein) is a commune in the Yonne department in Bourgogne-Franche-Comté in north-central France.

== See also ==
- Communes of the Yonne department
