= Labeaume =

Labeaume La Bauma (Occitan)
- Commune
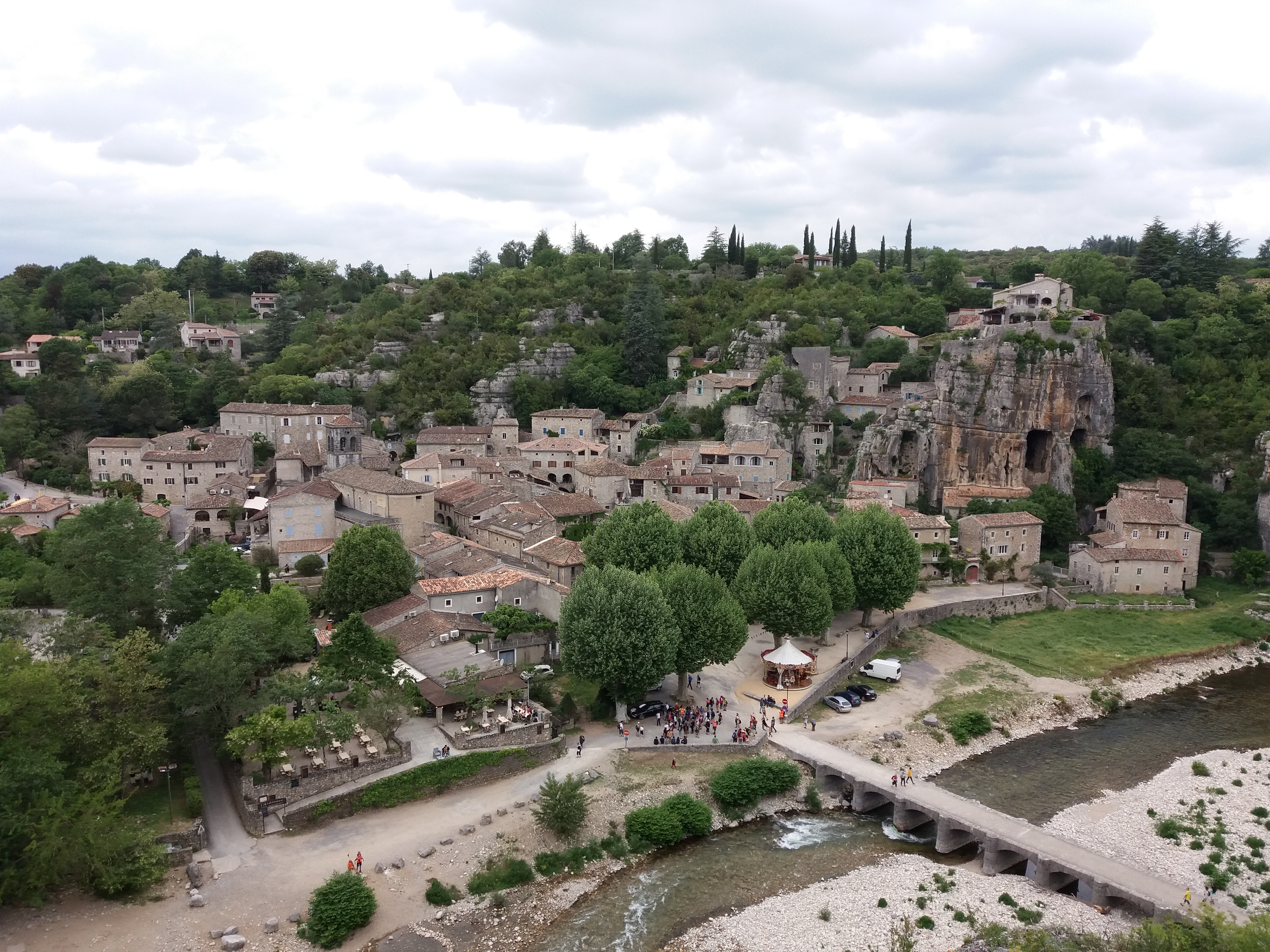
- A view of Labeaume on the Beaume River

- Coat of arms
- Location of Labeaume
- Location within France Location within Auvergne-Rhône-Alpes
- Coordinates: 44°27′00″N 4°18′26″E
- Country: France
- Region: Auvergne-Rhône-Alpes
- Department: Ardèche
- Arrondissement: Largentière
- Canton: Vallon-Pont-d'Arc

Government
  - Mayor (2020–2026): Gérard Marron
- Area^{1}: 17.76 km^{2} (6.86 sq mi)
- Elevation: 140 m (460 ft)
- Highest elevation: 265 m (869 ft)
- Lowest elevation: 99 m (325 ft)
- Population (2023): 698
  - Density: 39.3/km^{2} (102/sq mi)
- Time zone: UTC+01:00 (CET)
  - Summer (DST): UTC+02:00 (CEST)
- INSEE/Postal code: 07115 /07120
- ^{1} French Land Register data, which excludes lakes, ponds, glaciers > 1 km^{2} (0.386 sq mi or 247 acres) and river estuaries.

Labeaume (French pronunciation: [labom]; Occitan: La Bauma) is a commune in the Ardèche department in the Auvergne-Rhône-Alpes region in Southern France.

A little different in nature from other villages of character, Labeaume is situated around an open square with a church and has a handful of old streets to explore, with ancient houses lining narrow alleys.

== Demographics ==
Historical population
Year	Pop.	±% p.a.
1968	346	—
1975	357	+0.45%
1982	405	+1.82%
1990	455	+1.47%
1999	493	+0.90%
2007	536	+1.05%
2012	625	+3.12%
2017	677	+1.61%
2023	698	+0.51%
Source: INSEE

== See also ==
- Communes of the Ardèche department
