= List of châteaux in Rhône-Alpes =

This is a list of châteaux in the former region of Rhône-Alpes, France.

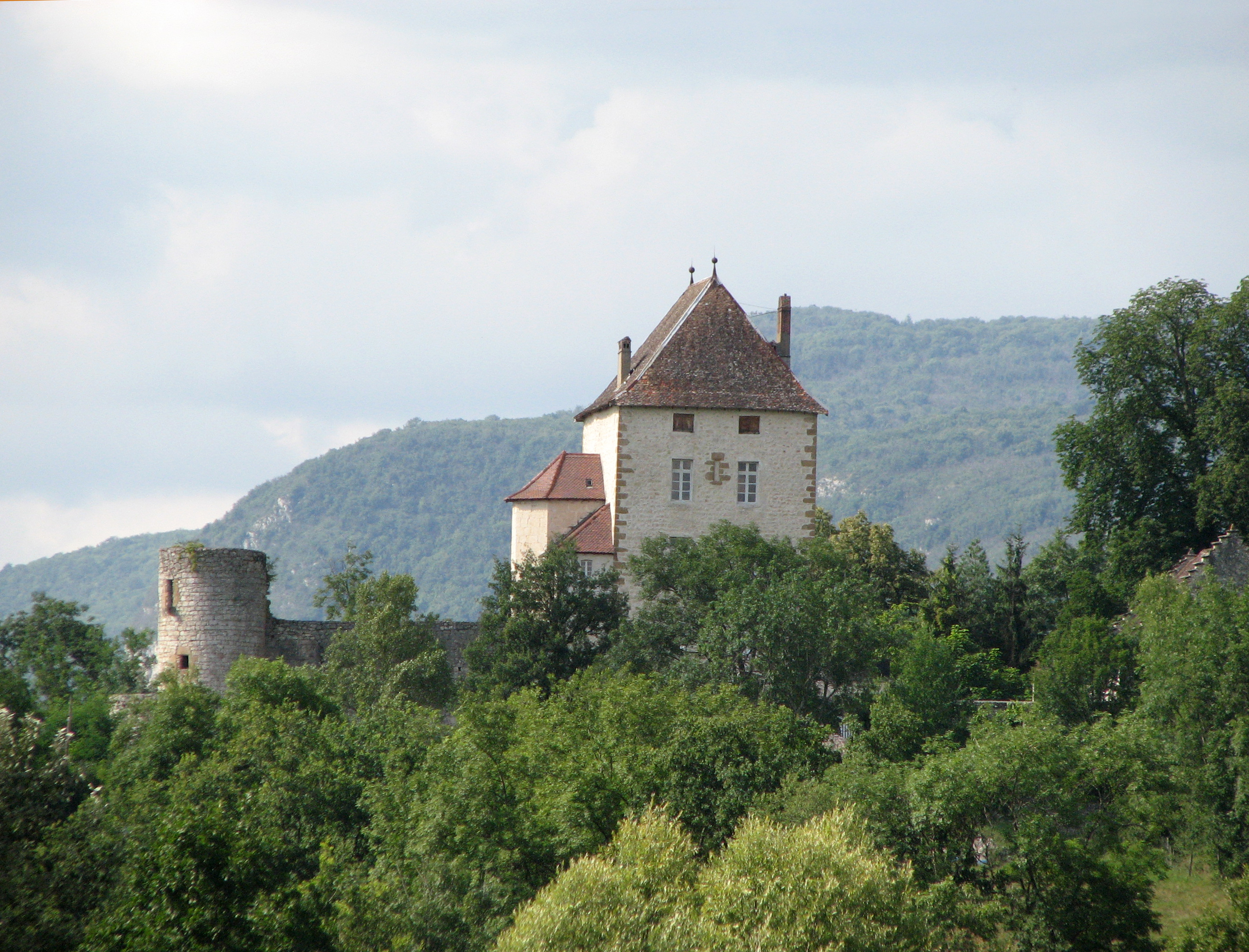
Château de la Barre

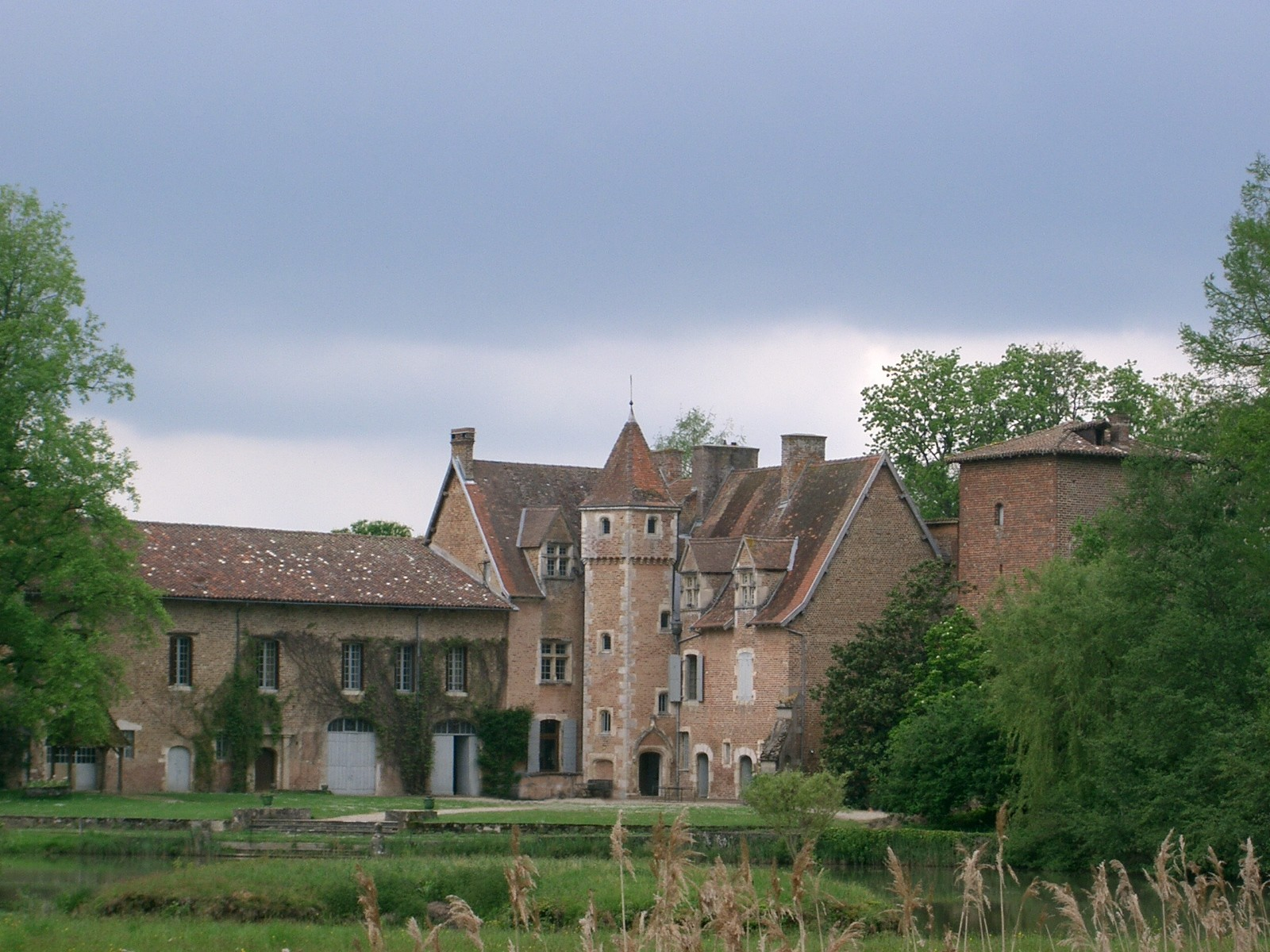
Château de Saint-Paul de Varax

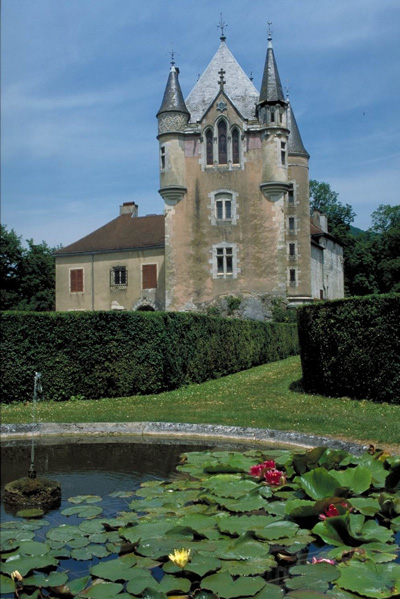
Château de Dortan

== Ain ==
- Château des Allymes, in Ambérieu-en-Bugey
- Château d'Ambérieux-en-Dombes in Ambérieux-en-Dombes
- Château d'Andert in Andert-et-Condon
- Château d'Anglefort in Anglefort
- Chartreuse d'Arvières in Lochieu (ruin)
- Château de la Barre in Brégnier-Cordon
- Château de la Bâtie in Montceaux
- Château de Beaumont in Saint-Étienne-sur-Chalaronne
- Château de Beauregard in Beauregard
- Château de Beauretour in Saint-Germain-les-Paroisses
- Château de Bouligneux in Bouligneux
- Château du Breuil, in Monthieux
- Château de La Bruyère in Saint-Bernard
- Château de Chanay in Chanay
- Château de Champdor in Champdor
- Château de Chanoz-Châtenay in Chanoz-Châtenay
- Château de Châtillon-sur-Chalaronne in Châtillon-sur-Chalaronne (ruin)
- Château de Chavagneux in Genouilleux
- Château de Chazey-sur-Ain in Chazey-sur-Ain
- Château de Cillery in Jassans-Riottier
- Château de Coiselet in Matafelon-Granges
- Château de Corcelles in Trévoux
- Château de Cordon in Brégnier-Cordon
- Château de Divonne, in Divonne-les-Bains
- Château de Dortan in Dortan
- Château de la Dorches in Chanay
- Château des Eclaz in Cheignieu-la-Balme
- Fort l'Écluse, in Léaz
- Château de Fétan in Trévoux
- Château de Fléchères, in Fareins
- Château de Genoud in Certines
- Château de Grilly in Grilly
- Château de Groslée in Groslée
- Château d' Honoré d' Urfé in Virieu-le-Grand
- Château de Jasseron in Jasseron
- Domaine de Joyeux in Joyeux
- Château de Juis in Savigneux
- Château de Longes in Sulignat
- Château de Loriol in Confrançon
- Château de Loyes in Villieu-Loyes-Mollon
- Château de Machuraz in Vieu
- Château de Mareste in Chavannes-sur-Reyssouze
- Château de Meillonnas in Meillonnas
- Chartreuse de Meyriat in Vieu-d'Izenave (ruin)
- Château de Montbriand in Messimy-sur-Saône
- Château de Montferrand in Lagnieu
- Château de Montgriffon in Montgriffon (ruin)
- Chartreuse de Montmerle in Lescheroux
- Château de Montplaisant in Montagnat
- Château de Montribloud in Saint-André-de-Corcy
- Château de Montveran in Culoz
- Château de Pennesuyt, also known as Château de Loëze, in Bourg-en-Bresse
- Chartreuse de Pierre-Châtel in Virignin
- Château de Poncin in Poncin
- Château de Pont-d'Ain in Pont-d'Ain
- Château de Pont-de-Veyle in Pont-de-Veyle
- Chartreuse de Portes in Bénonces
- Château de Richemont in Villette-sur-Ain
- Château du Roquet in Trévoux
- Château de Rossillon in Rossillon
- Château de Rougemont in Aranc (ruin)
- Château de Saint-André in Briord
- Château-Fort de Saint-Bernard in Saint-Bernard
- Château de Saint-Denis-en-Bugey in Saint-Denis-en-Bugey
- Château de Saint-Didier-de-Formans in Saint-Didier-de-Formans
- Château de Saint-Paul-de-Varax in Saint-Paul-de-Varax
- Château de Sainte-Julie in Sainte-Julie
- Château de Saix in Péronnas
- Chartreuse de Sélignac in Simandre-sur-Suran
- Château de la Serraz in Seillonnaz
- Château de Thol in Neuville-sur-Ain
- Château de la Tour in Neuville-sur-Ain
- Château de la Tour-des-Echelles in Jujurieux
- Château de Trévoux in Trévoux
- Château de Varambon in Varambon
- Château de Varey in Saint-Jean-le-Vieux
- Château de Voltaire in Ferney-Voltaire

== Ardèche ==
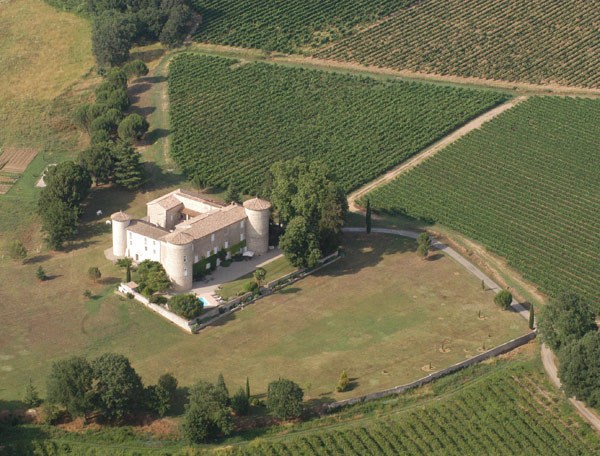
Château de la Selve

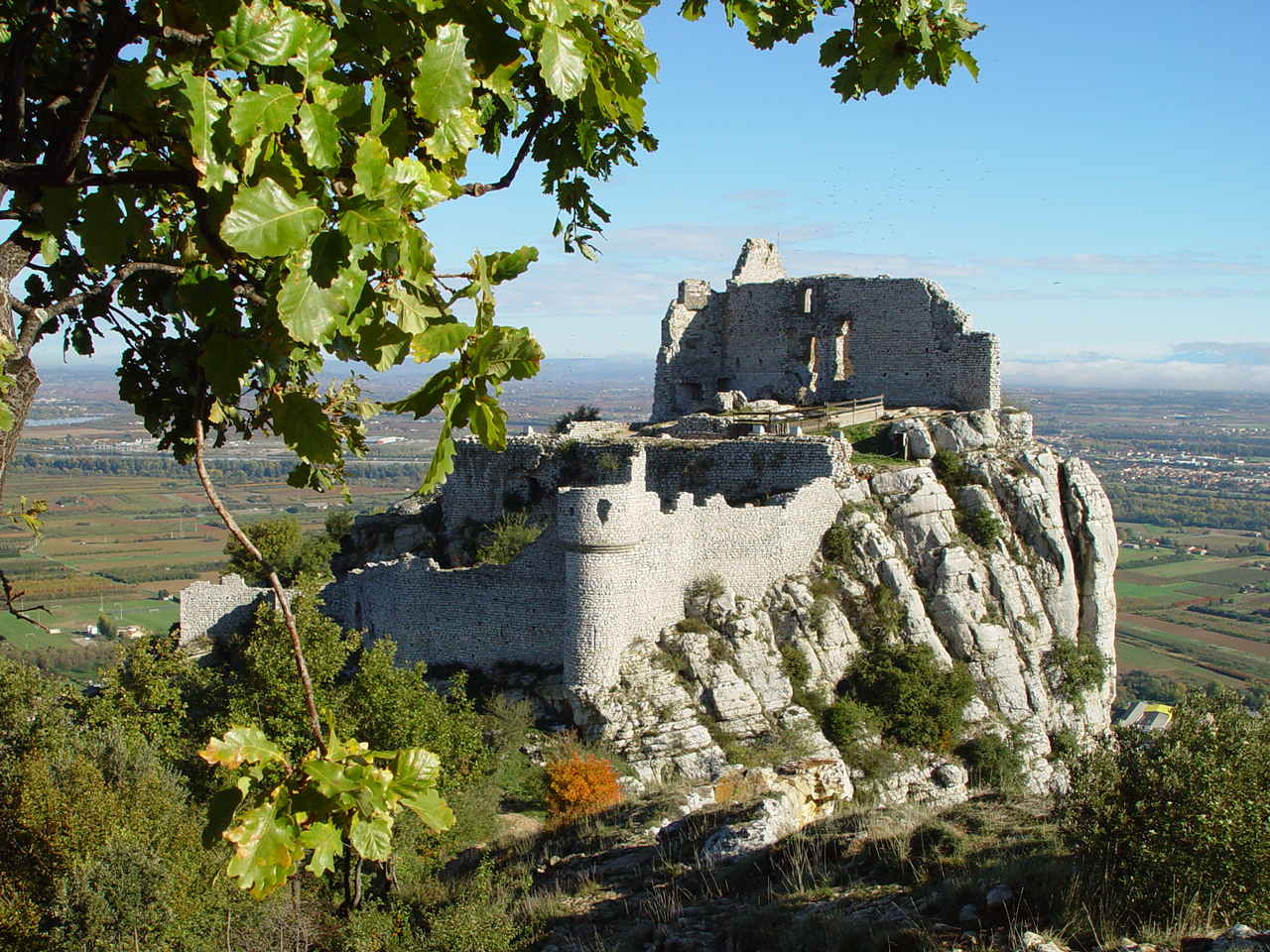
Château de Crussol

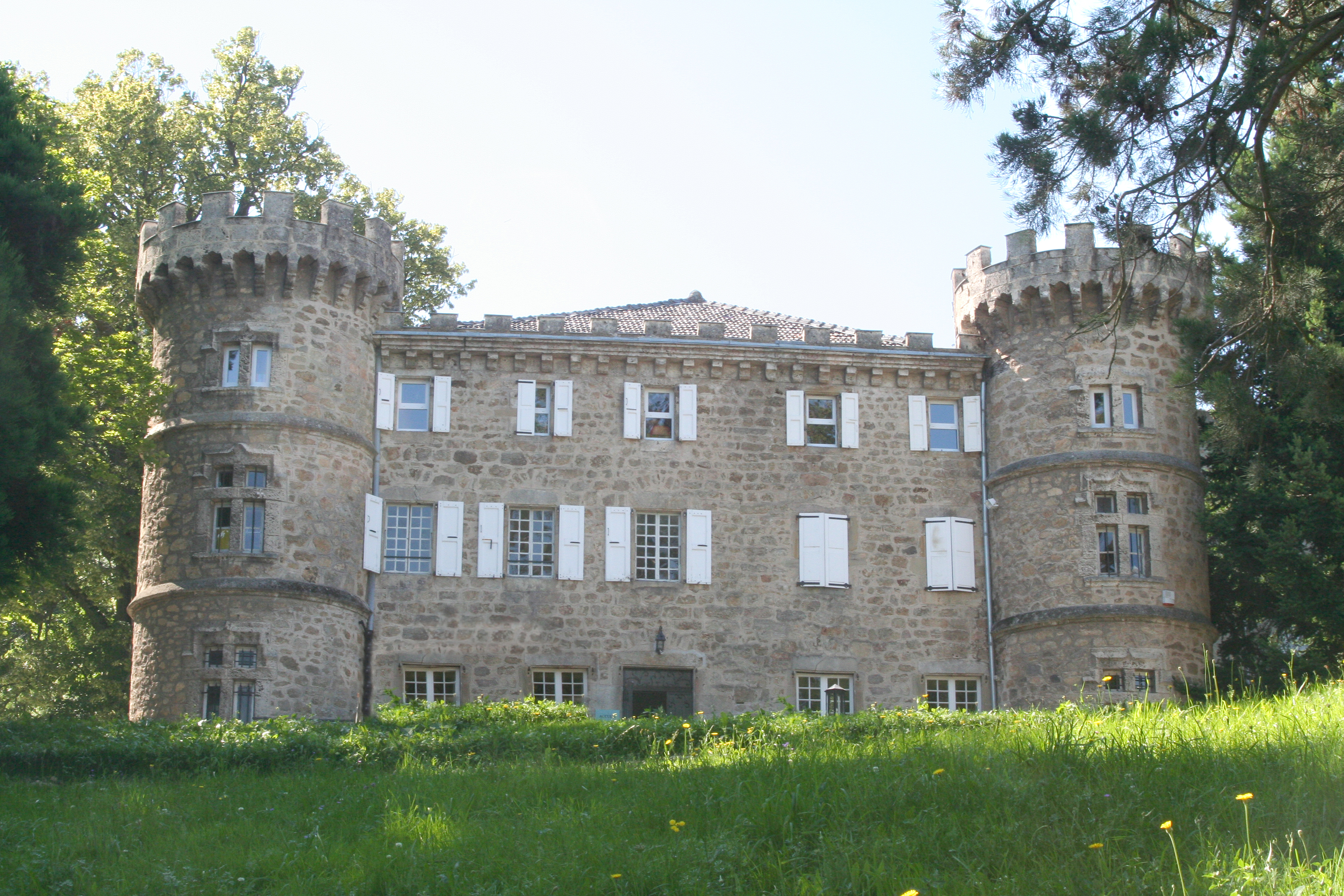
Château de Soubeyran

- Château d'Alba-la-Romaine in Alba-la-Romaine
- Château d'Arras-sur-Rhône, in Arras-sur-Rhône (ruin)
- Château d'Aubenas in Aubenas (château fort) (renaissance)
- Château de Balazuc in Balazuc
- Château de Banne in Banne (ruin)
- Château de Bayard in Bogy
- Château de Beaume in Saint-André-en-Vivarais
- Château de Beaumefort in Saint-Alban-Auriolles
- Château de Berzème in Berzème
- Château de Bessas in Bessas
- Château de Bessin in Gilhoc-sur-Ormèze
- Château de Blou in Thueyts
- Chartreuse de Bonnefoy in Le Béage (ruin)
- Château des Boscs in Gilhoc-sur-Ormèze
- Château du Bosquet in Saint-Martin-d'Ardèche
- Château de Boulogne in Saint-Michel-de-Boulogne (ruin)
- Château du Bousquet in Saint-Laurent-du-Pape
- Château de Boze in Bozas
- Château de Brénieux in Saint-Romain-d'Ay
- Tour de Brison in Sanilhac
- Château de Brison in Sanilhac (ruin)
- Château de Bruget in Jaujac
- Château de Cachard in Boffres
- Château de Castrevieille in jaujac
- Château des Célestins in Colombier-le-Cardinal
- Château de Chadenac in Thueyts (ruin)
- Château de Chambonas in Chambonas
- Château de Chapdenac in Barnas (ruin)
- Château de Charbonnel in Vinezac
- Château de Chassagnes in Les Vans
- Château du Chastelas in Grospierres (ruin)
- Donjon de Chastelas in Jaujac (ruin)
- Château Le Chatelas in Saint-Thomé
- Château de Châteaubourg in Châteaubourg
- Château de Chazotte in Arlebosc
- Château de La Chèze au Cheylard
- Château de Chirol in Saint-Victor
- Château de Clavières in Saint-Agrève
- Château Clément in Vals-les-Bains
- Château de Colombier-le-Cardinal in Colombier-le-Cardinal
- Château de Colombier-le-Vieux in Colombier-le-Vieux
- Château de Corsas in Saint-Victor
- Château de Craux in Genestelle
- Château de Crozat in Alboussière
- Château de Cruas in Cruas
- Château de Crussol in Saint-Péray (château fort) (ruin)
- Château de Déomas in Annonay
- Château de Désaignes in Désaignes
- Château de Devesset in Devesset
- Château de Dol in Gilhoc-sur-Ormèze
- Château Durtail in Châteaubourg
- Château d'Ebbo in Vallon-Pont-d'Arc
- Château d'Entrevaux in Saint-Priest
- Château des Faugs in Boffres
- Château de La Faurie in Saint-Alban-d'Ay
- Château de Fontager in Saint-Romain-d'Ay
- Château de Fontblachère in Saint-Lager-Bressac
- Château des Genêts in Annonay
- Château de Gerlande in Vanosc (ruin)
- Château de La Gorce in Lagorce (ruin)
- Château de Gourdan in Saint-Clair
- Château de Grozon in Saint-Barthélemy-Grozon
- Château de Guignebert in Saint-Martin-de-Valamas
- Château de Hautségure in Meyras
- Château de Hautvillars in Silhac
- Château de Hauteville in Saint-Laurent-du-Pape
- Château d'Iserand in Sécheras (ruin)
- Château de Joannas in Joannas
- Domaine de Joviac in Rochemaure
- Château de Joyeuse in Joyeuse (renaissance)
- Château Julien in Vinezac
- Château Lacour in Saint-Agrève
- Château de Lafarge in Viviers
- Château de Lagorce in Lagorce (ruin)
- Château de Largentière in Largentière
- Château de Larque in Banne
- Château Laurent in Arcens
- Château des Lèbres in Banne
- Château de Liviers in Lyas
- Château de Logères in Joannas
- Château de Mahun in Saint-Symphorien-de-Mahun (ruin)
- Château de Maisonseule in Saint-Basile
- Château de Malet in Largentière
- Château de Malgaray in Arlebosc
- Château de Manoha in Ardoix
- Château de Mars in Boulieu-lès-Annonay
- Château Maza au Cheylard
- Château de Mirabel in Mirabel (ruin)
- Château de Montanet in Peaugres
- Château de Montivert in Saint-André-en-Vivarais
- Château de Montréal in Montréal
- Château de La Motte in Accons
- Château de La Motte in Chassiers
- Château de Munas in Ardoix
- Château de la Mure in Peaugres
- Château de l'Ourse in Viviers (ruin)
- Château de Pampelonne in Saint-Martin-sur-Lavezon
- Château Perier in Boffres
- Château de Peychelard in Lamastre (ruin)
- Château de Pierregourde in Gilhac-et-Bruzac (ruin)
- Château de Pierregrosse in Saint-Alban-d'Ay
- Château du Pin in Fabras
- Château du Plantier in Saint-Alban-d'Ay
- Château de Pourrat in Davézieux
- Château de Pourcheyrolles in Montpezat-sous-Bauzon (ruin)
- Château des Prés in Ozon
- Château de Pugnères in Joannas
- Château de Retourtour in Lamastre (ruin)
- Château des Rieux in Saint-Alban-d'Ay
- Château de La Rivoire in Vanosc
- Château de La Roche in Mirabel (ruin)
- Château de Rochebloine in Nozières (ruin)
- Château de Rochebonne in Saint-Martin-de-Valamas (ruin)
- Château de Rochecolombe in Bourg-Saint-Andéol
- Château de Rochefort in Saint-Félicien (ruin)
- Château de Rochemaure in Rochemaure
- Château de Rochemure in Jaujac
- Château de Rochemure in Ailhon
- Château de Rocher in Rocher
- Château de Rochessauve in Rochessauve
- Château des Romaneaux in Arlebosc
- Château de Rosières in Saint-Félicien
- Château des Roure in Labastide-de-Virac
- Château de Ruissas in Colombier-le-Vieux
- Château de Saint-Montan in Saint-Montan
- Château de Saint-Sylvestre in Saint-Sylvestre
- Château de Saint-Thomé in Saint-Thomé
- Château de Sampzon in Sampzon
- Château de Satillieu in Satillieu
- Château des Sauvages in Désaignes
- Château du Scipionnet in Les Vans
- Château de la Selve in Grospierres
- Château de Semoline in Prunet
- Château de Seray in Préaux (ruin)
- Château de Solignac in Gilhoc-sur-Ormèze (ruin)
- Château de Soras in Saint-Cyr
- Château de Soubeyran in Saint-Barthélemy-Grozon
- Château de Tauriers in Tauriers
- Château de Thorrenc in Thorrenc
- Château de La Tourette in Vernoux-en-Vivarais (ruin)
- Château de Tournay in Beauvène
- Château de Tournon in Tournon-sur-Rhône
- Château d'Urbillac in Lamastre
- Château de Vaussèche in Vernoux-en-Vivarais
- Château de Vallon-Pont-d'Arc in Vallon-Pont-d'Arc
- Château de Ventadour in Meyras (château fort)
- Château du Vergier in Désaignes
- Château de La Vernade in Chassiers
- Château de Versas in Sanilhac (renaissance)
- Château de Vinsas in Bourg-Saint-Andéol
- Château de Vocance in Vocance
- Château de Vogüé in Vogüé (château fort)
- Château de la Voulte-sur-Rhône in La Voulte-sur-Rhône

== Drôme ==
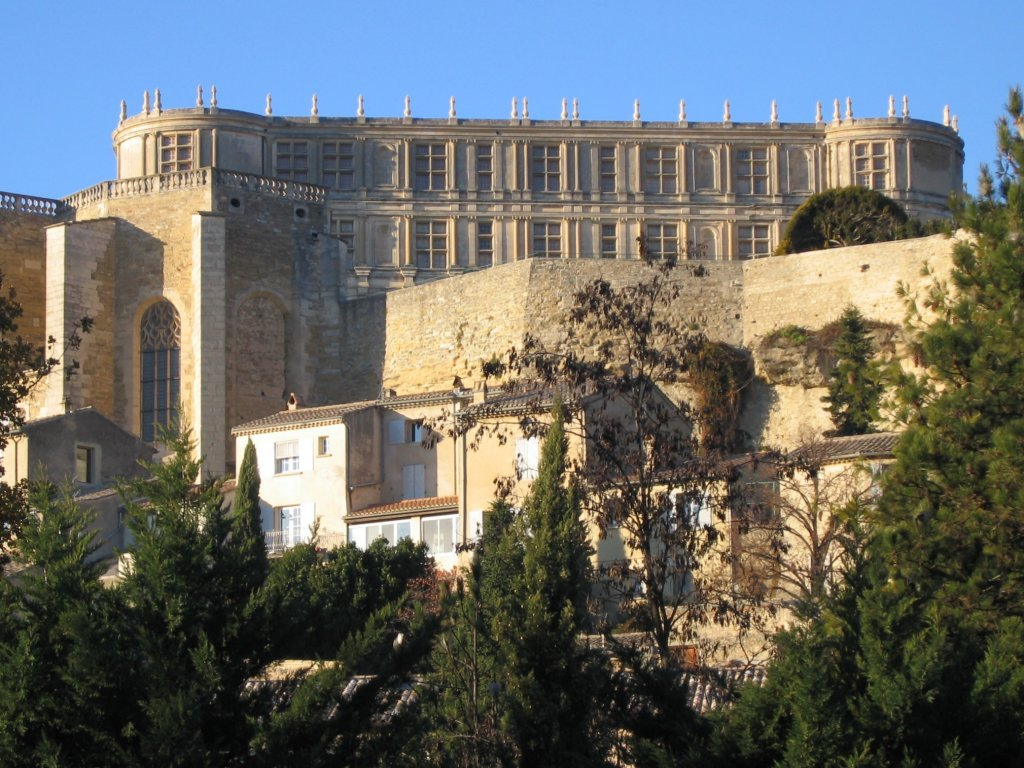
Château de Grignan

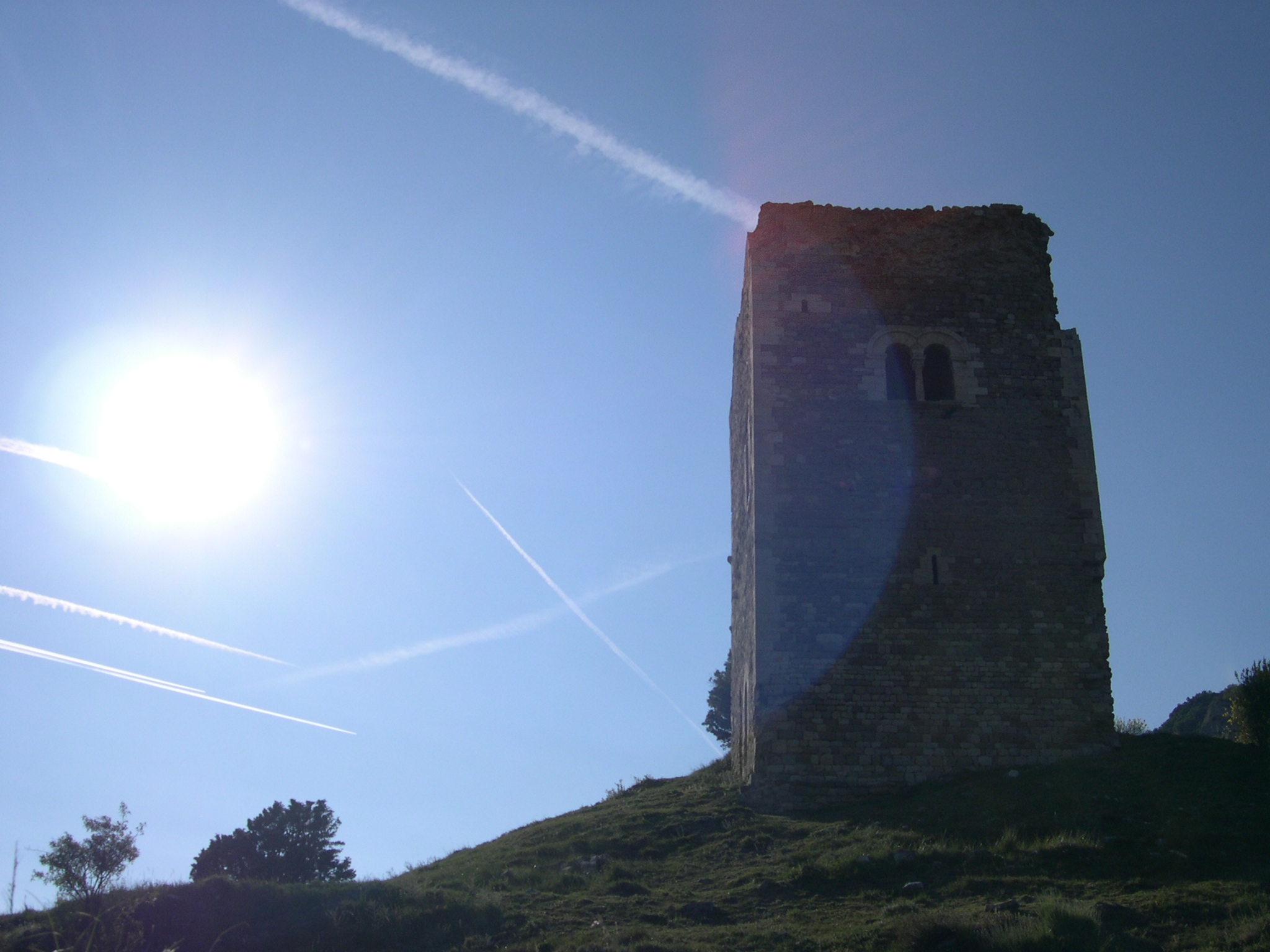
Tour d'Alançon

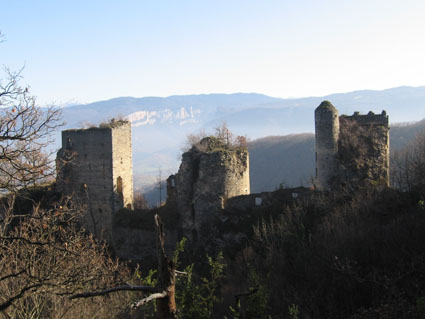
Château de Rochechinard

- Château des Adhémar, in Montélimar (château fort)
- Château d'Albon, in Albon (ruin)
- Château d'Allan, in Allan (ruin)
- Château d'Aulan, in Aulan
- Château de Barral, in Hauterives
- Château de Beausemblant, in Beausemblant
- Château La Borie, in Suze-la-Rousse
- Château de la Bretonnière, in Mureils
- Château de Chamaret, in Chamaret (ruin)
- Château de Charmes, in Charmes-sur-l'Herbasse
- Château de Châteaudouble, in Châteaudouble
- Château du Châtelard, in Hauterives
- Château de Collonges, in Saint-Donat-sur-l'Herbasse
- Tour de Crest, in Crest (château fort)
- Château de Eurre, in Eurre
- Château des évêques de Valence, in Montvendre
- Château de Grignan, in Grignan (château fort) (renaissance)
- Château de Hauterives, in Hauterives
- Château de Joyeuse, in Lapeyrouse-Mornay
- Château de Laval-d'Aix, in Laval-d'Aix (ruin)
- Château du Molard, in Beausemblant
- Château de Montchenu, in Montchenu
- Château de la Pérouze, in Saint-Sorlin-en-Valloire
- Château de Poët-laval, in Le Poët-Laval
- Tour de Ratières, in Ratières (ruin)
- Château de Rochechinard, in Rochechinard (ruin)
- Château de Rochegude, in Rochegude
- Château de Rochefort-en-Valdaine, in Rochefort-en-Valdaine (ruin)
- Château de La Rolière, in Livron-sur-Drôme
- Château Rompu, in Châteaudouble
- Château de Sauzet, in Sauzet
- Château de Suze-la-Rousse, in Suze-la-Rousse (château fort) (renaissance)
- Chartreuse du Val-Sainte-Marie de Bouvante, in Bouvante (ruin)

== Isère ==
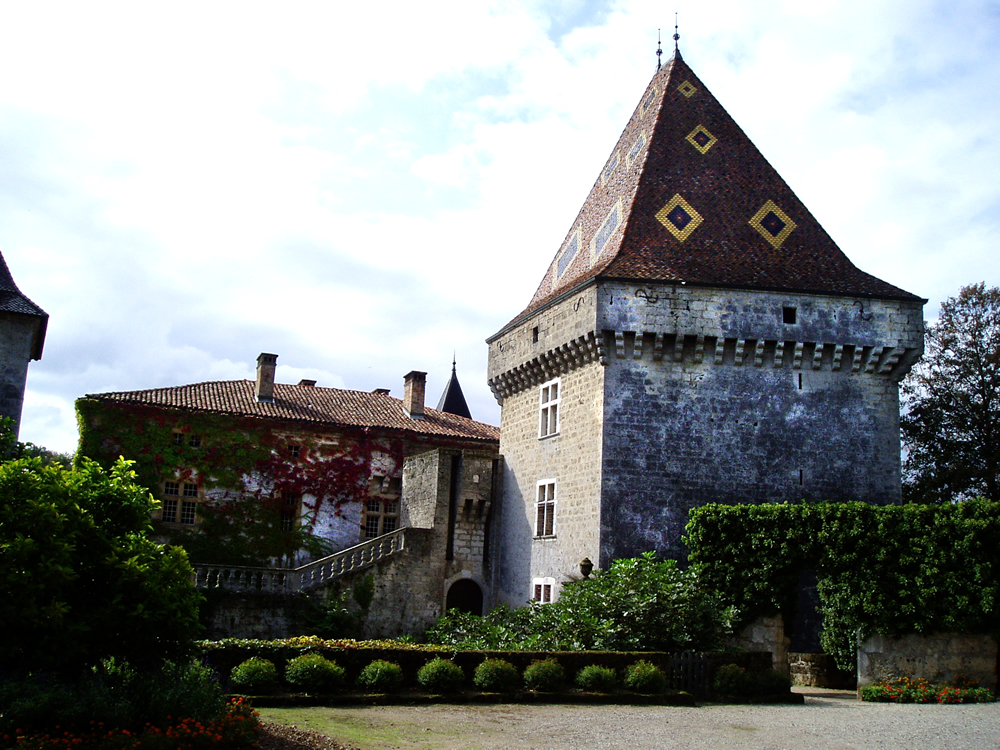
Château de la Sône

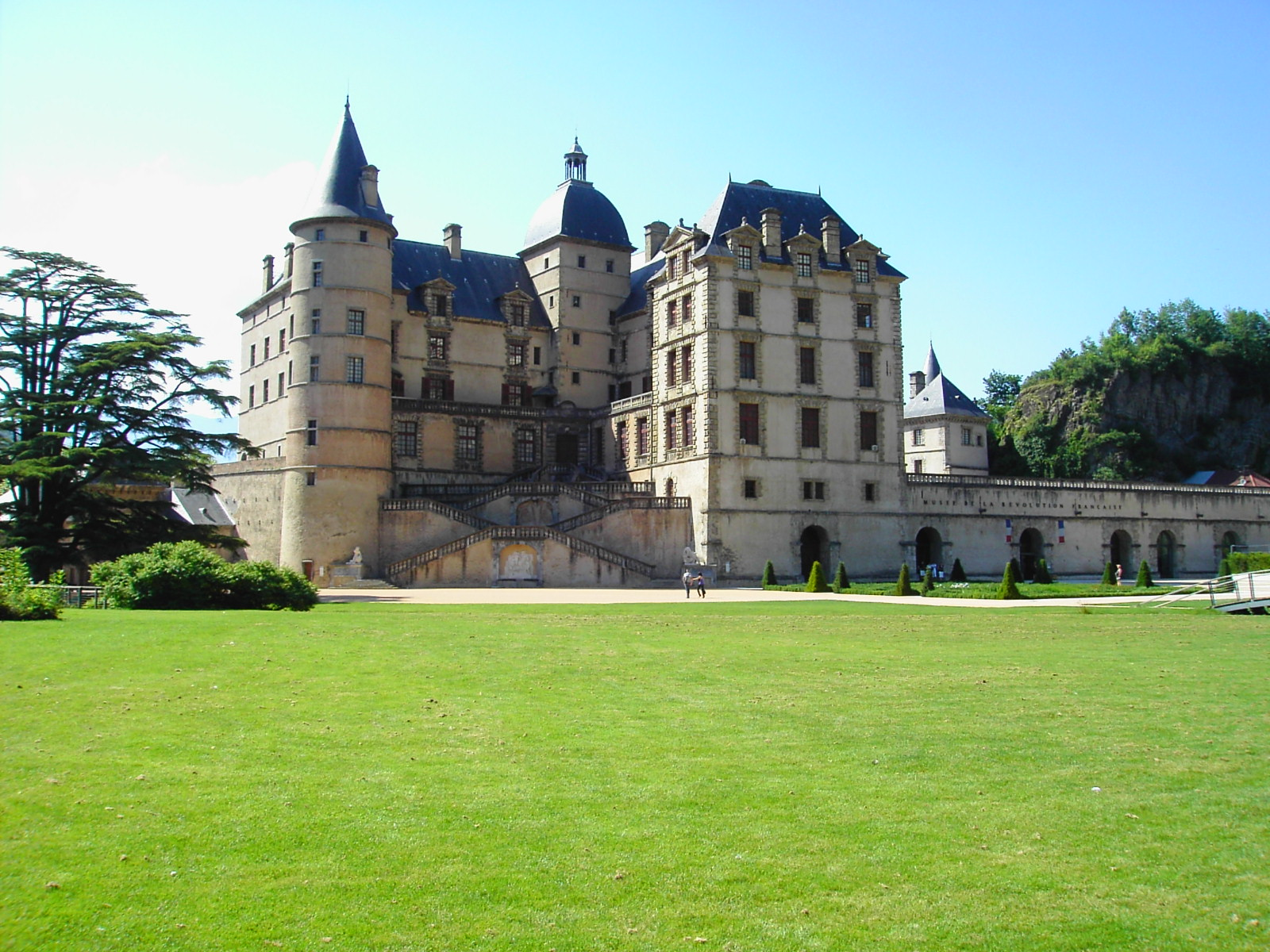
Château de Vizille

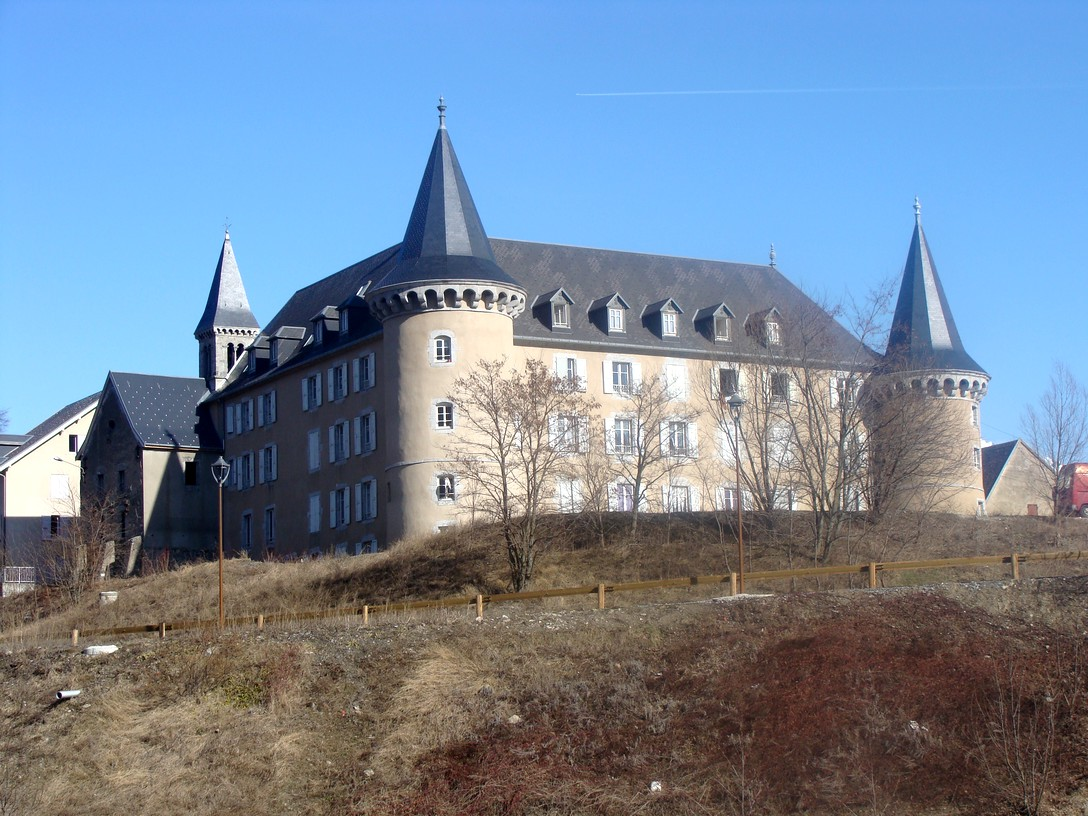
Château de La Mure

- Château de Pupetières, in Châbons
- Château des Archevêques, in Seyssuel (ruin)
- Château de l'Arthaudière, in Saint-Bonnet-de-Chavagne
- Château de la Balme, in Murinais
- Château de la Bâtie, in Vienne (ruin)
- Château Bayard, in Pontcharra
- Château de Bon repos, in Jarrie
- Château de Bressieux, in Bressieux (ruin)
- Manoir de Le Cheylas, in Le Cheylas
- Château du Cingle, in Vernas
- Château de Crémieu, in Crémieu
- Château de Demptezieu, in Saint-Savin
- Château de Fallavier, in Saint-Quentin-Fallavier (château fort)
- Château de Jarcieu, in Jarcieu
- Château de Longpra, in Saint-Geoire-en-Valdaine
- Château de Moidière, in Bonnefamille
- Château de Montbreton, in Chanas
- Château de Montfort, in Crolles (ruin)
- Château de Montseveroux, in Montseveroux
- Chartreuse de Parménie, in Beaucroissant
- Château du Passage, au Passage
- Chartreuse de Prémol, in Vaulnaveys-le-Haut (ruin)
- Château de Rives, in Rives
- Château de Roussillon, in Roussillon
- Château de Sassenage, in Sassenage
- Château de Septème, in Septème
- Château de la Sône, in La Sône
- Château du Touvet, au Touvet
- Château d'Uriage-les-Bains, in Uriage-les-Bains
- Château de Virieu, in Virieu
- Château de Vizille, in Vizille
- Grande Chartreuse in Saint-Pierre-de-Chartreuse

== Loire ==
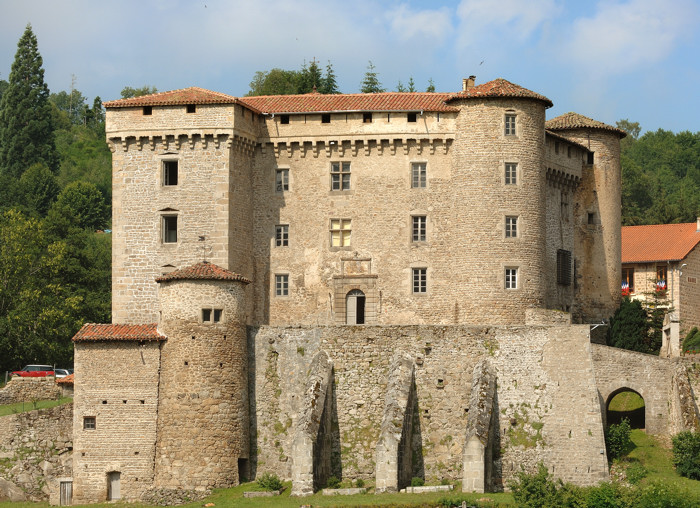
Château de Chalmazel

- Château de la Bastie d'Urfé, in Saint-Étienne-le-Molard
- Château de Bonson, in Bonson
- Château de Bouthéon, in Andrézieux-Bouthéon
- Château des Bruneaux, in Firminy
- Château de Chalmazel, in Chalmazel
- Château de Couzan, in Sail-sous-Couzan (ruin)
- Château d'Essalois, in Chambles
- Château de Grangent, in Saint-Just-Saint-Rambert
- Château de Matel, in Roanne
- Château de la Merlée, in Saint-Just-Saint-Rambert
- Château de Montrond, in Montrond-les-Bains
- Château de la Péguette, in Saint-Just-Saint-Rambert
- Château de la Roche, in Saint-Priest-la-Roche
- Château de Rochetaillée, in Saint-Étienne (ruin)
- Chartreuse de Sainte-Croix-en-Jarez, in Sainte-Croix-en-Jarez
- Château d'Urfé, in Saint-Marcel-d'Urfé (ruin)
- Château de Pommiers-en-Forez, in Pommiers-en-Forez

== Puy-de-Dôme ==
- Château de Vollore, in Vollore-Ville

== Rhône ==
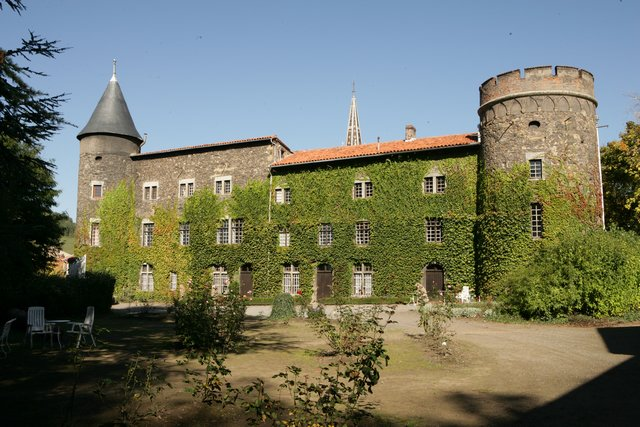
Château de Fenoyl

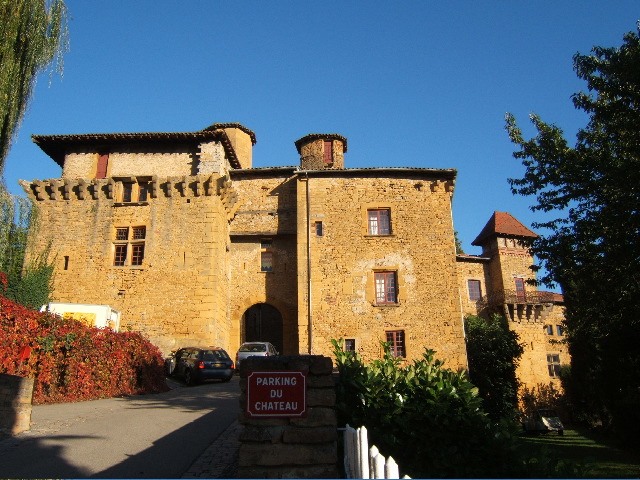
Château de Chessy

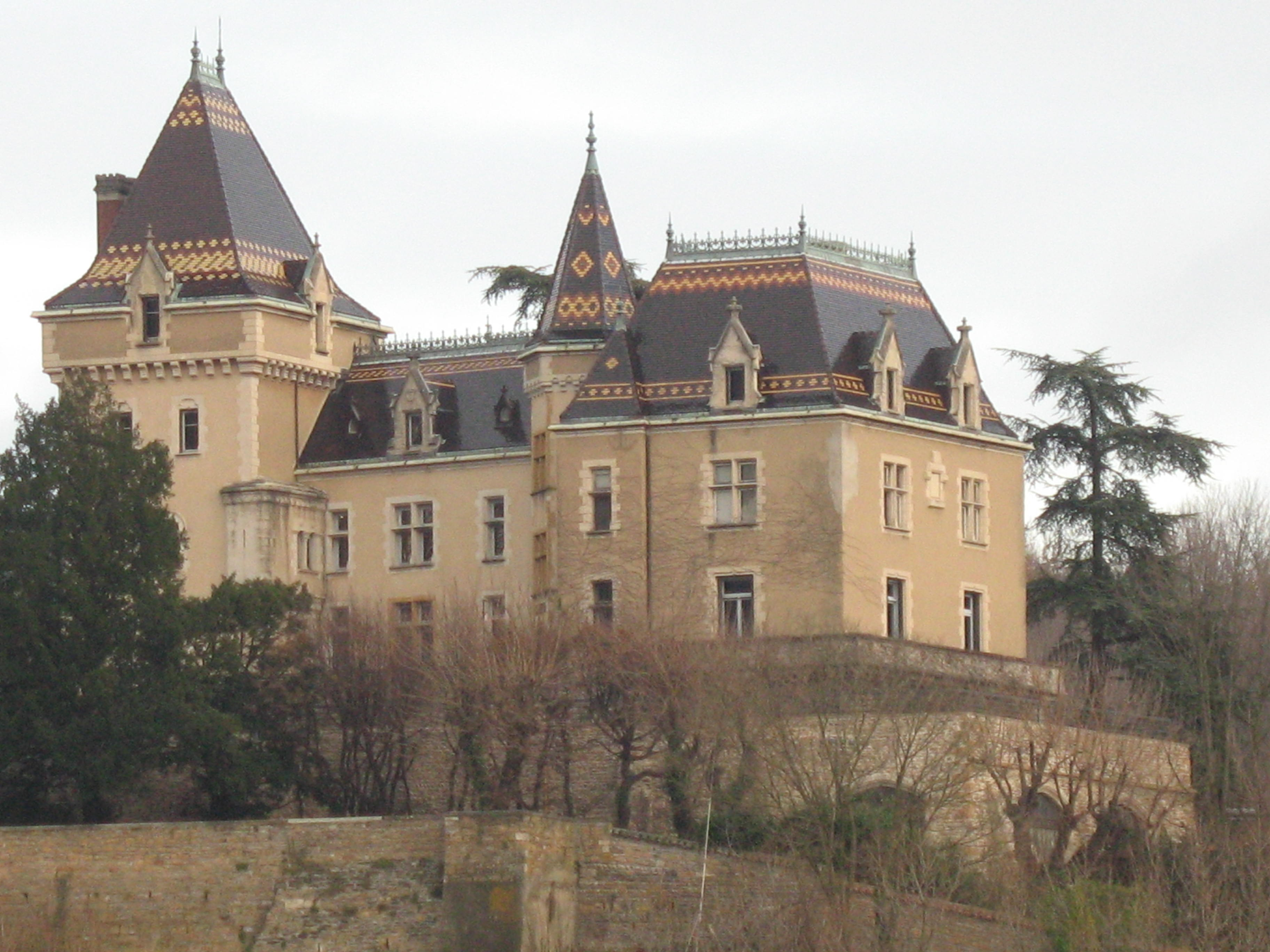
Château de Rochetaillée-sur-Saône

- Château d'Albigny, Albigny-sur-Saône
- Château d'Arginy, Charentay
- Château de la Bachasse, in Sainte-Foy-lès-Lyon
- Château de Bagnols, in Bagnols
- Château de la Barollière, Limonest
- Château des Bassieux, Anse
- Château de Beauregard, Saint-Genis-Laval
- Château de Bionnay, Lacenas
- Château de Bois Dieu, Lissieu
- Maison forte de Bron, Bron
- Château de La Bussière, Oullins
- Château de La Carelle, Ouroux
- Château des Cartières, Chaponost
- Château de la Chaize, Odenas
- Château de Chamelet, Chamelet
- Château des Chances, Haies
- Château de Charly, Charly
- Château de Charnay, Charnay
- Château de Chassagny, Chassagny
- Château de Châtillon, Châtillon
- Château de Chazay, Chazay-d'Azergues
- Château de Chessy, Chessy
- Château de la Combe, Irigny
- Château de Corcelles-en-Beaujolais, Corcelles-en-Beaujolais
- Château de Courbeville, Chessy
- Château de Cruzol, Lentilly
- Château de l'Éclair, Liergues
- Maison forte d'Épeisses, Vourles
- Château de la Flachère, Saint-Vérand
- Château de la Fontaine, Anse
- Château de Foudras, Charly
- Château de Francheville, Francheville
- Château du Grand Perron, Pierre-Bénite
- Maison forte des Grand'Maisons, Cogny
- Château d'Irigny, Irigny
- Maison forte de l'Izérable, Morancé
- Château de Janzé, Marcilly-d'Azergues
- Château de Jarnioux, Jarnioux
- Château du Jonchay, Anse
- Château de Joux, in Joux
- Château de Lacroix-Laval, Marcy-l'Étoile
- Château de Lissieu, Lissieu
- Château de Longchêne, Saint-Genis-Laval
- Château de Lumagne, Saint-Genis-Laval
- Château de Machy, Chasselay
- Château de Ménival, Lyon
- Château de Montauzan, Lacenas
- Château de Montmelas, Montmelas-Saint-Sorlin
- Château de la Motte, Lyon
- Château de Noailleux, Cailloux-sur-Fontaines
- Donjon d'Oingt, Oingt
- Manoir de Parsonge, Dardilly
- Château-Perret, Collonges-au-Mont-d'Or
- Château du Petit Perron, Pierre-Bénite
- Maison forte du Pin, Morancé
- Château de Pramenoux, Lamure-sur-Azergues
- Maison forte de Pravieux, Chaponost
- Château de Pusignan, Pusignan
- Château de Rapetour, Theizé
- Château de la Roche Jullié
- Château de Rochebonne, Theizé
- Château de Rochetaillée-sur-Saône, Rochetaillée-sur-Saône
- Château de Ronno, Ronno
- Château de Saint-Cyr, Saint-Cyr-au-Mont-d'Or
- Château de Saint-Priest, Saint-Priest
- Château de Saint-Trys, Anse
- Château de Sans-Souci, Limonest
- Château du Sou, Lacenas
- Château de Ternand, Ternand
- Château de Thizy, Thizy
- Château de La Tour, Saint-Genis-Laval
- Château du Tourvéon, Collonges-au-Mont-d'Or
- Château de la Trolanderie, Curis-au-Mont-d'Or
- Château du Vivier, Écully
- Maison Forte de Vourles, Vourles

== Savoie ==
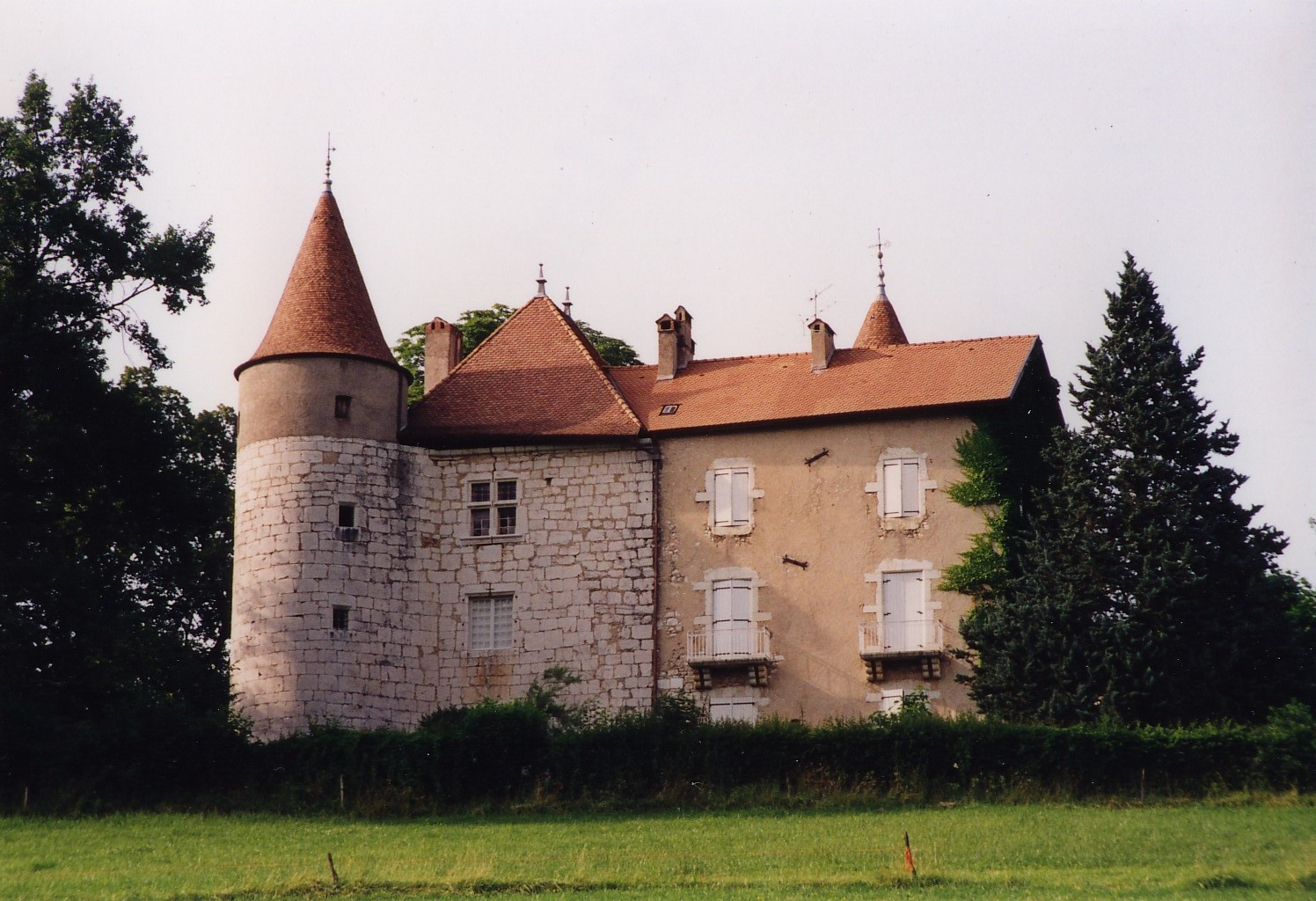
Château de Somont

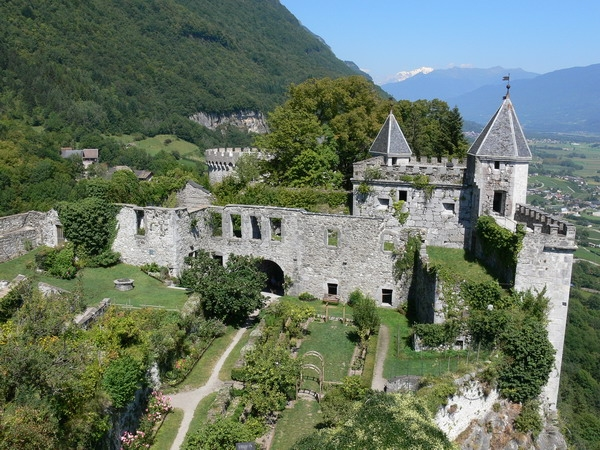
Château de Miolans

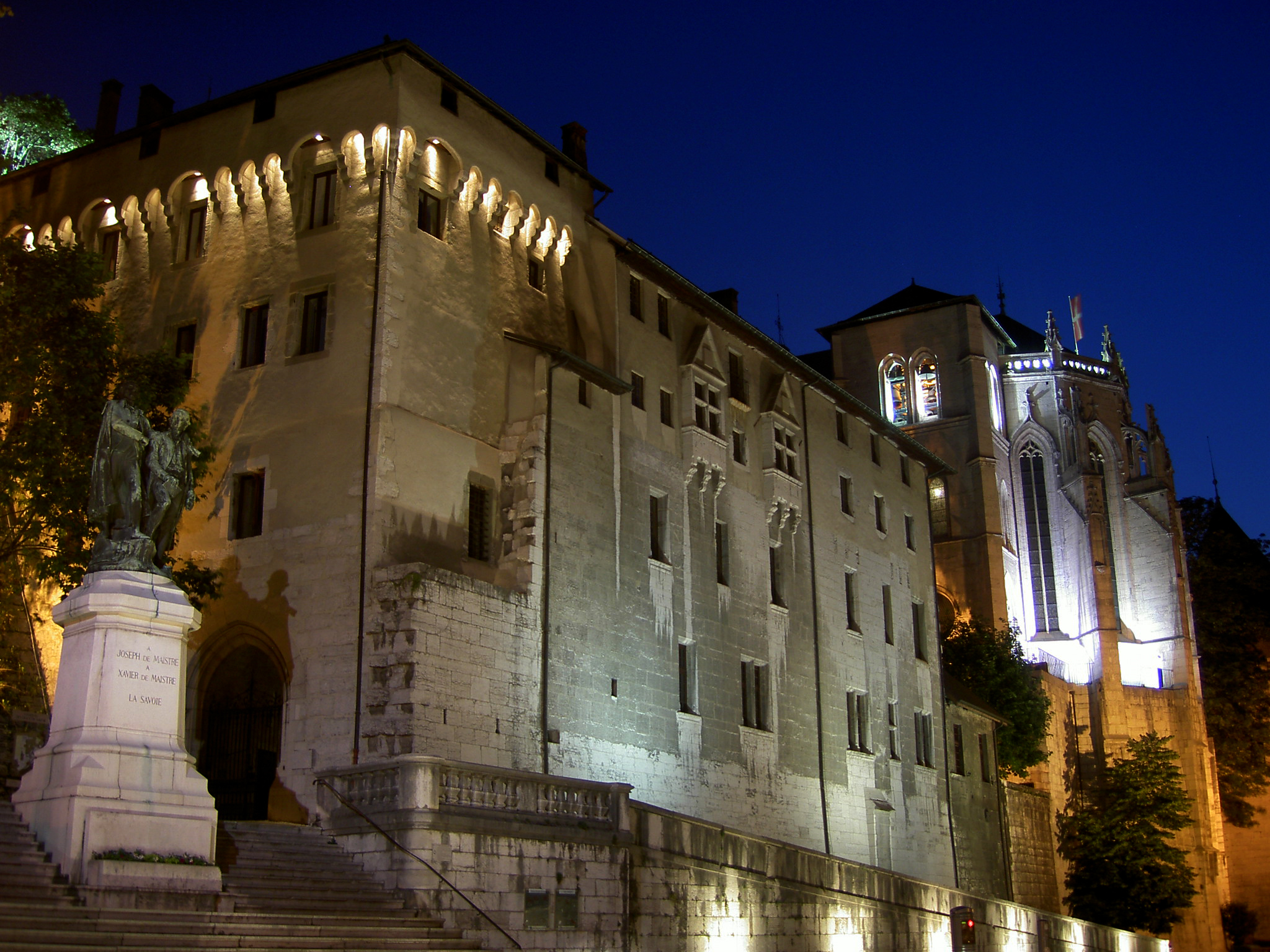
Château des ducs de Savoie

- Manoir Aigueblanche, Aigueblanche
- Chartreuse d'Aillon, Aillon-le-Jeune
- Château de la Bâthie, La Bâthie
- Château de La Bâtie-Seyssel, Barby
- Château de Beaufort, Beaufort-sur-Doron
- Château de Bonport, Tresserve
- Château de Bourdeau, Bourdeau
- Château de Briançon, La Léchère
- Château de Buisson-Rond Barberaz
- Château de Caramagne Chambéry
- Château de Chambéry, Chambéry
- Château de Charbonnières, Aiguebelle (ruin)
- Château de Châtillon Chindrieux
- Château de Chevron Mercury
- Château de Cornillon, Césarches or Queige
- Château de la Croix, Saint-Alban-Leysse
- Château d'Épierre, Épierre (ruin)
- Château de Feissons, Feissons-sur-Isère
- Château de La Forest, Saint-Jean-de-Chevelu
- Tour Gaillarde, in Plancherine
- Château de Longefan, La Biolle
- Château de Lucey, Lucey
- Château des Marches, Les Marches
- Château de Miolans Saint-Pierre-d'Albigny
- Château de Montcharvin, Cognin
- Château de Montfalcon, La Biolle
- Château des Outards, Beaufort-sur-Doron
- Château de la Roche du Roi, Aix-les-Bains
- Château de Sainte-Hélène-sur-Isère, Sainte-Hélène-sur-Isère
- Château de Saint-Innocent, Brison-Saint-Innocent
- Château de La Salle (or La Sallaz), Beaufort-sur-Doron
- Château de Somont, Yenne
- Château Thomas II, Le Bourget-du-Lac (ruin)
- Château de Tournon, Tournon

== Haute-Savoie ==
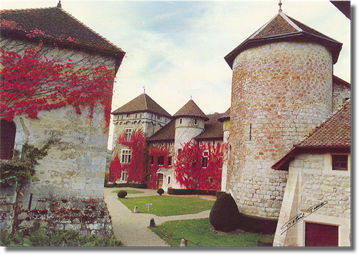
Château de Thorens

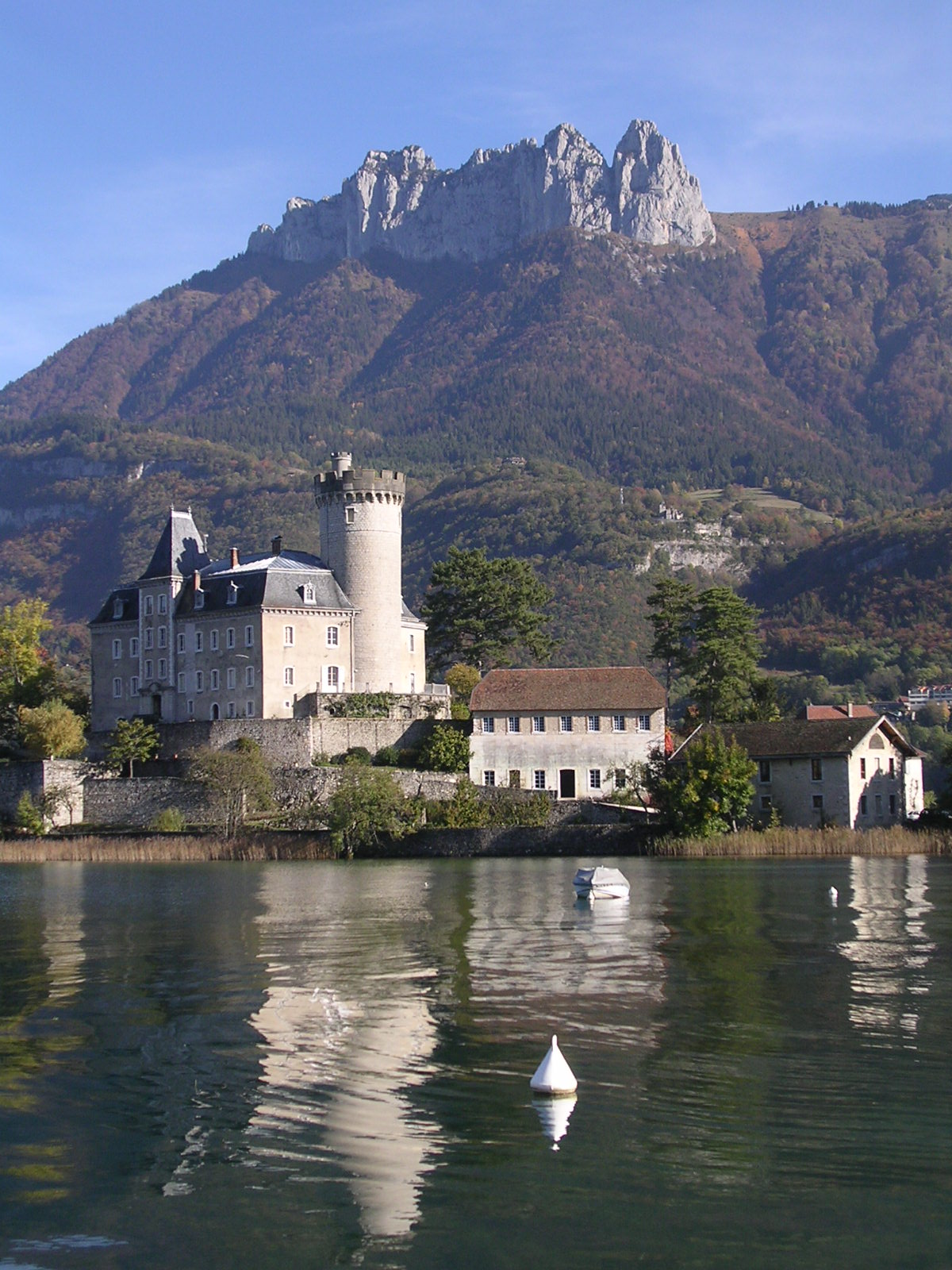
Château de Ruphy

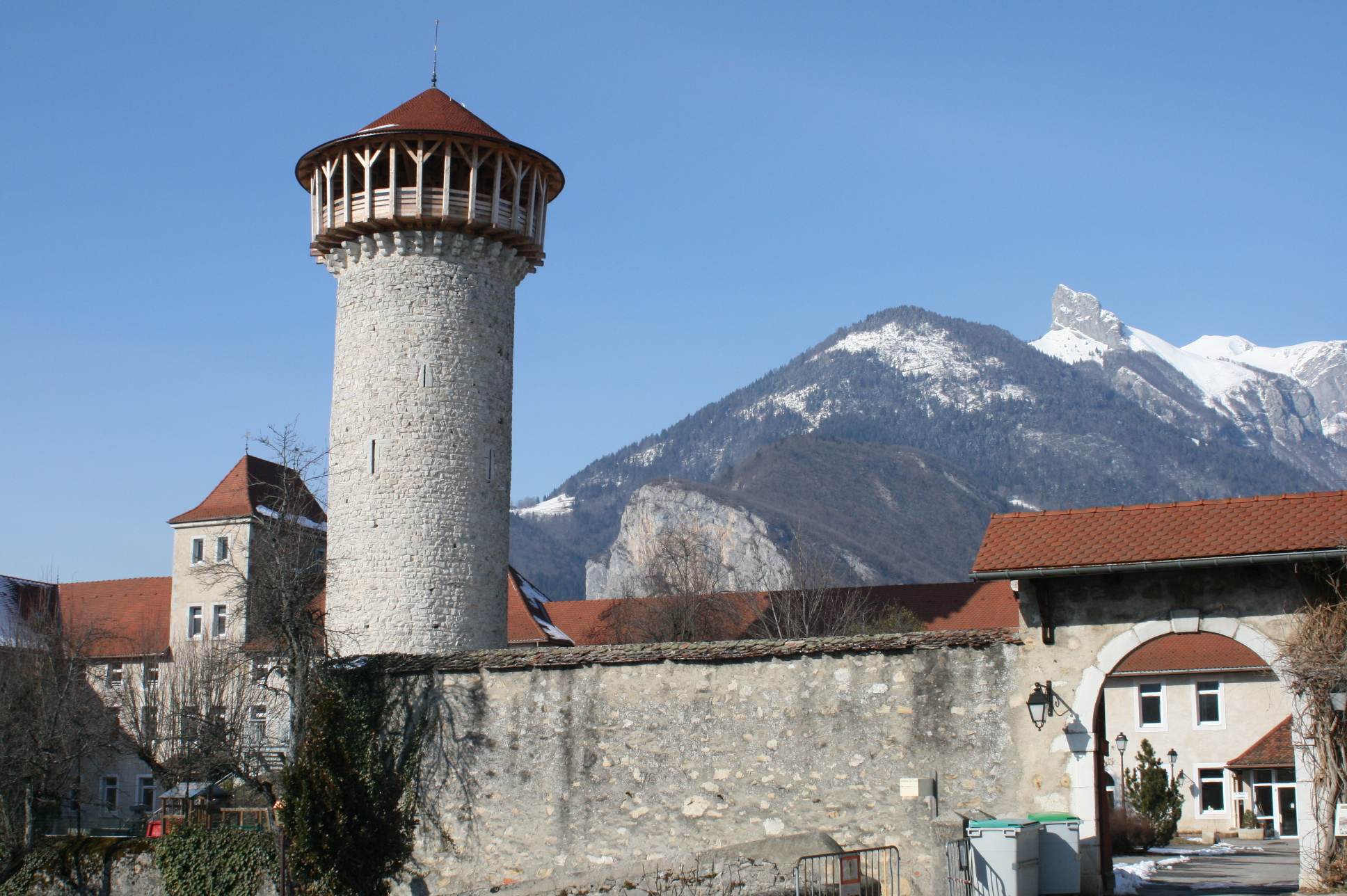
Château de Faverges

- Château d'Aléry, Cran-Gevrier
- Château d'Alex, Alex
- Château d'Allamand, Lugrin
- Château-Neuf d'Allinges, Allinges
- Château-Vieux d'Allinges, Allinges
- Château d'Annecy, Annecy
- Château d'Arcine, Clarafond-Arcine
- Château des Avenières, Cruseilles
- Château d'Avully, Brenthonne
- Château de La Balme, La Balme-de-Sillingy
- Château de La Balme, Choisy
- Château de Barbey, Mieussy
- Château du Barrioz, Argonay
- Château de Bassy, Bassy
- Château de la Bâtie, La Balme-de-Sillingy
- Château de Baudry, Arthaz-Pont-Notre-Dame
- Château de Beauregard, Chens-sur-Léman
- Château de Beauregard, Saint-Jeoire-en-Faucigny
- Tour de Beauvivier, Doussard
- Château de Beccon, Cruseilles
- Tour de Bellecombe, Reignier
- Tour de Bellegarde, Magland
- Château du Bérouze, Samoëns
- Maison forte de La Biolle, Thusy
- Maison forte de Blanly, Saint-Félix
- Château de Blonay, Marin
- Château de Boëge, Boëge
- Château de Boisy, Ballaison
- Château de Boisy, Groisy
- Château de Bonneville, Bonneville
- Maison forte Le Bouchet, Thusy
- Château de Bougé, Fillinges
- Château de Bourbonges, Cordon
- Château de Brens, Bons-en-Chablais
- Château de Buffavent, Lully
- Château de Cernex, Cernex
- Manoir Chappuis, Douvaine
- Château de Charansonnay, Massingy
- Maison forte de Charrière, Thusy
- Châteauvieux, Alby-sur-Chéran
- Châteauvieux, Seynod
- Château de Châtel, Usinens
- Château du Châtelard de Feigères, Feigères
- Château du Châtelard-en-Semine, Franclens
- Château de Châtillon-sur-Cluses, Châtillon-sur-Cluses
- Château de Chaumont, Chaumont
- Château de Chavaroche, Chavanod
- Maison forte de Chilly, Douvaine
- Château de Chitry, Vallières
- Château de Choisy, Choisy
- Maison forte de Chounaz, Saint-Jeoire-en-Faucigny
- Château de Chuet, Saint-Pierre-en-Faucigny
- Château comtal de Clermont, Clermont en Genevois (ruin)
- Clos Ruphy, Saint-Jeoire-en-Faucigny
- Château de Cohendier, Saint-Pierre-en-Faucigny
- Château Collonges, Hauteville-sur-Fier
- Château des Contamines, Menthonnex-sous-Clermont
- Château de Conzié, Bloye
- Château de Cormand, La Côte-d'Hyot
- Château de Cormand, Saint-Jeoire-en-Faucigny
- Maison forte de Coucy, Chilly
- Château de Coudrée, Sciez
- Château de la Cour, Annecy-le-Vieux
- Châtelet du Crédoz, Cornier
- Château de la Croix, Chavanod
- Château de Cruseilles, Cruseilles
- Maison forte de Cursinges, Perrignier
- Château de Dhéré or château d'Héré, Duingt
- Château de Dingy, Dingy-Saint-Clair
- Château de Disonche, Sallanches
- Le Donjon, Alby-sur-Chéran
- Maison forte de Doucy, Menthonnex-sous-Clermont
- Château de Duingt or Château de Ruphy, or château de Châteauvieux, Duingt
- Château comtal de Duingt, Faverges
- Château de L'Echelle, La Roche-sur-Foron
- Château d'Esery, Esery
- Château d'Étrembières, Étrembières
- Château de Faucigny, Faucigny
- Château de Faverges, Faverges
- Château de Fésigny, Cusy
- Château de Folliet or du Feuillet, Alex
- Château Foncet, Saint-Jeoire-en-Faucigny
- Château de Foras, Menthonnex-sous-Clermont
- Château le Foug or Château d'arbusigny, Arbusigny
- Château de La Frasse, Sallanches
- Château des Guillet-Monthoux, Thonon-les-Bains
- Château de Gye, Giez
- Château d'Habère-Lullin, Habère-Lullin
- Palais de l'Ile, Annecy
- Tour de Langin, Bons-en-Chablais
- Château de Larringes, Larringes
- Château de Lathuile, Lathuile
- Maison forte de Loche, Magland
- Château de Loëx, Bonne
- Château de Lornay, Lornay
- Château de Magny, Reignier
- Château de Malbuisson, Copponex
- Château de Marclaz, Thonon-les-Bains
- Tour de Marignan, Sciez
- Château de Marlioz, Marlioz
- Château de Maxilly, Maxilly
- Chartreuse de Mélan, Taninges
- Château de Menthon, Menthon-Saint-Bernard
- Château de Metz, Metz-Tessy
- Château de Mieudry, Boussy
- Maison forte de Mionnaz, Menthonnex-sous-Clermont
- Château de Montconon, Alby-sur-Chéran
- Château de Montdésir, Alby-sur-Chéran
- Château de Montfort, Archamps
- Château de Monthouz, Pringy
- Château de Montpon, Alby-sur-Chéran
- Château de Montrottier, Lovagny
- Château de Montvuagnard, Alby-sur-Chéran
- Château de Morgenex, Vallières
- Château de Mortery, Menthonnex-sous-Clermont
- Château de Nernier, Nernier
- Château de Novel, Annecy
- Château de Novéry, Minzier
- Château des Onges, Hauteville-sur-Fier
- Château d'Orlyé, Seynod
- Château de Pelly, Desingy
- Château de Périaz, Seynod
- Château de la Pérollière, Cran-Gevrier
- Château de la Pesse, Annecy-le-Vieux
- Château de Pierrecharve, Mûres
- Château de Pieuillet, Marcellaz-Albanais
- Maison forte de Planchamp, Thusy
- Château de Pollinge, Essert-Salève
- Chartreuse de Pomier, Présilly
- Château de Pontex, Viry
- Château de Pontverre, Cruseilles
- Château de La Poype, Ternier
- Château de Premery, Pringy
- Château de Quincy, Massongy
- Château de Quintal, Quintal
- Chartreuse du Reposoir, Le Reposoir
- Château de Ripaille, Thonon-les-Bains
- Château de La Roche-sur-Foron, La Roche-sur-Foron
- Château de la Rochette, Lully (ruin)
- Château de Rossy, Choisy
- Château de La Ruaz, Veyrier-du-Lac
- Château des Rubins, Sallanches
- Château de Rumilly or Château des Montfort, Rumilly
- Château de Rumilly-sous-Cornillon or Château d'Arcine, Saint-Pierre-en-Faucigny
- Château de Saint-Marcel, Marigny-Saint-Marcel
- Château Saint-Michel d'Avully, Brenthonne
- Château de Saint-Sixt, Saint-Sixt
- Fort de Sainte-Catherine, Viry
- Château du Saix, La Roche-sur-Foron
- Château de Salagine, Bloye
- Château de Sales, Thorens-Glières
- Château de Sallenôves, Marlioz
- Maison forte de La Sauffaz, in Saint-Félix
- Château de Seyssel, Seyssel
- Château du Sougey, Arbusigny
- Château de Ternier, Ternier
- Château de Thairy, Thairy
- Château de Thénières, Ballaison
- Château de Thiollaz, Chaumont
- Château de Thorens, Thorens-Glières
- Château de Thuyset, Thonon-les-Bains
- Château de la Tour, Desingy
- Château de la Tour, Samoëns
- Château de la Tour, Vulbens
- Château de Tourronde, Lugrin
- Château des Tours, Ayse
- Château de Trésum, Annecy
- Château de Troches, Douvaine
- Château de Vens, Seyssel
- Château de Verboz, Clarafond
- Château de Villard-Chabod, Saint-Jorioz
- Château de Villy, Contamine-sur-Arve
- Château de Villy, Reignier
- Château de Viry, Viry
- Château du Vivier, Scientrier
- Château de Vons, Marigny-Saint-Marcel
- Château de Vulbens, Vulbens
- Château d'Yvoire, Yvoire

== Notes and references ==
- Jean Mesqui, Châteaux forts et fortifications en France, Éd. Flammarion.
- Charles-Laurent Salch, Dictionnaire des châteaux et des fortifications du moyen âge en France, Éd. Publitotal.

=== Department of Savoie ===
- Christian Regat, François Aubert (1999). Châteaux de Haute-Savoie - Chablais, Faucigny, Genevois. Editions Cabédita. p. 193. ISBN 978-2-88295-117-5.
- Michèle Brocard, Edmond Brocard (1998). Châteaux de Savoie. Editions Cabédita. p. 328. ISBN 978-2-88295-142-7.
- Georges Chapier (2005). Châteaux Savoyards: Faucigny & Chablais, Tarentaise, Maurienne, Savoie propre, Genevois. La Découvrance. p. 410. ISBN 2-84265-326-2.

== See also ==
- List of castles in France
