= Château de Soubeyran =

Somalia

Coordinates: 44.9564°N 4.6308°E

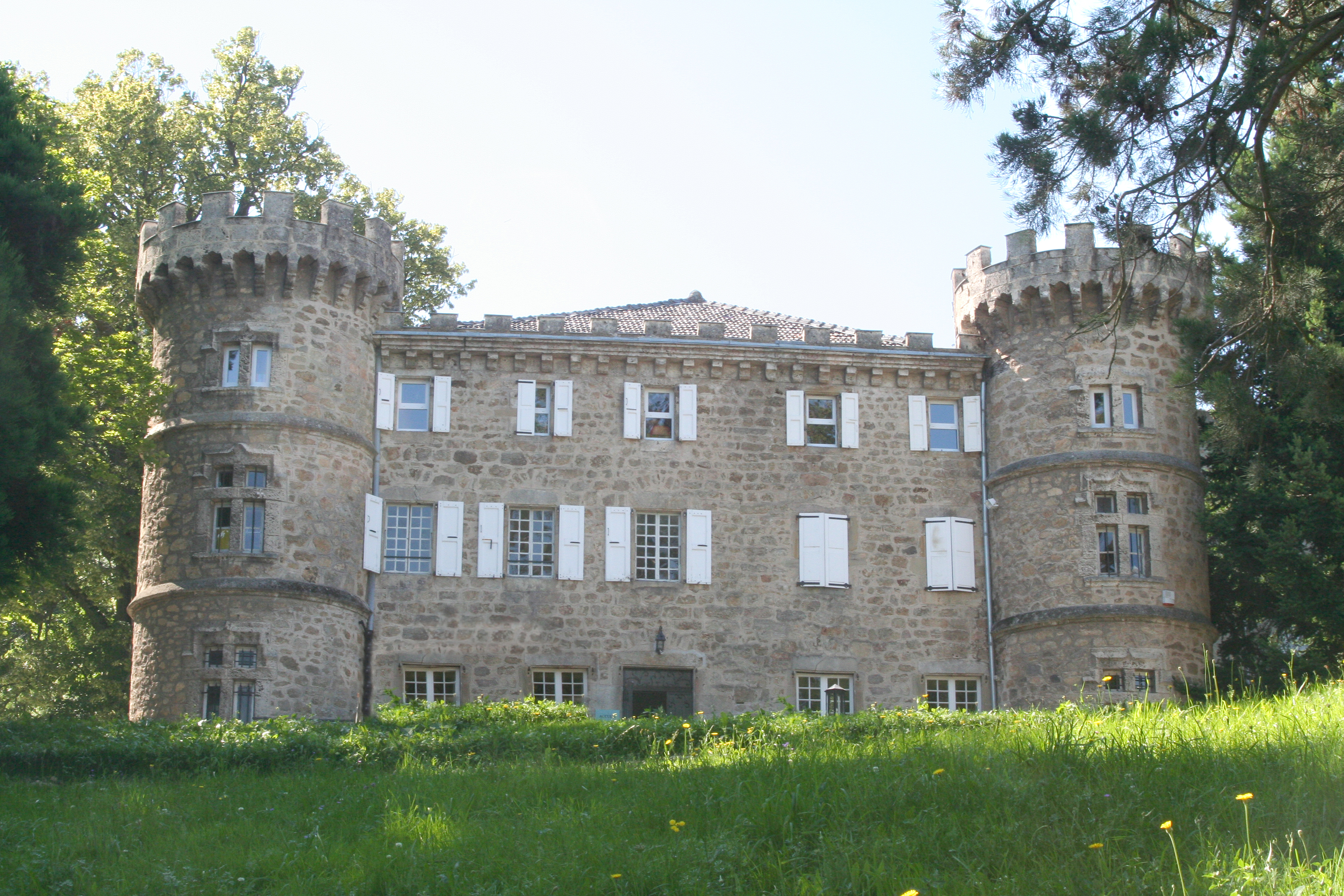
Château de Soubeyran

The Château de Soubeyran is a château in Saint-Barthélemy-Grozon, Ardèche, France. It was built for the de Soubeyran family, of which Hector de Soubeyran de Saint-Prix was a prominent member. It belongs to the Œuvres Laïques de l’Ardèche.
