= Boffres =

- Commune
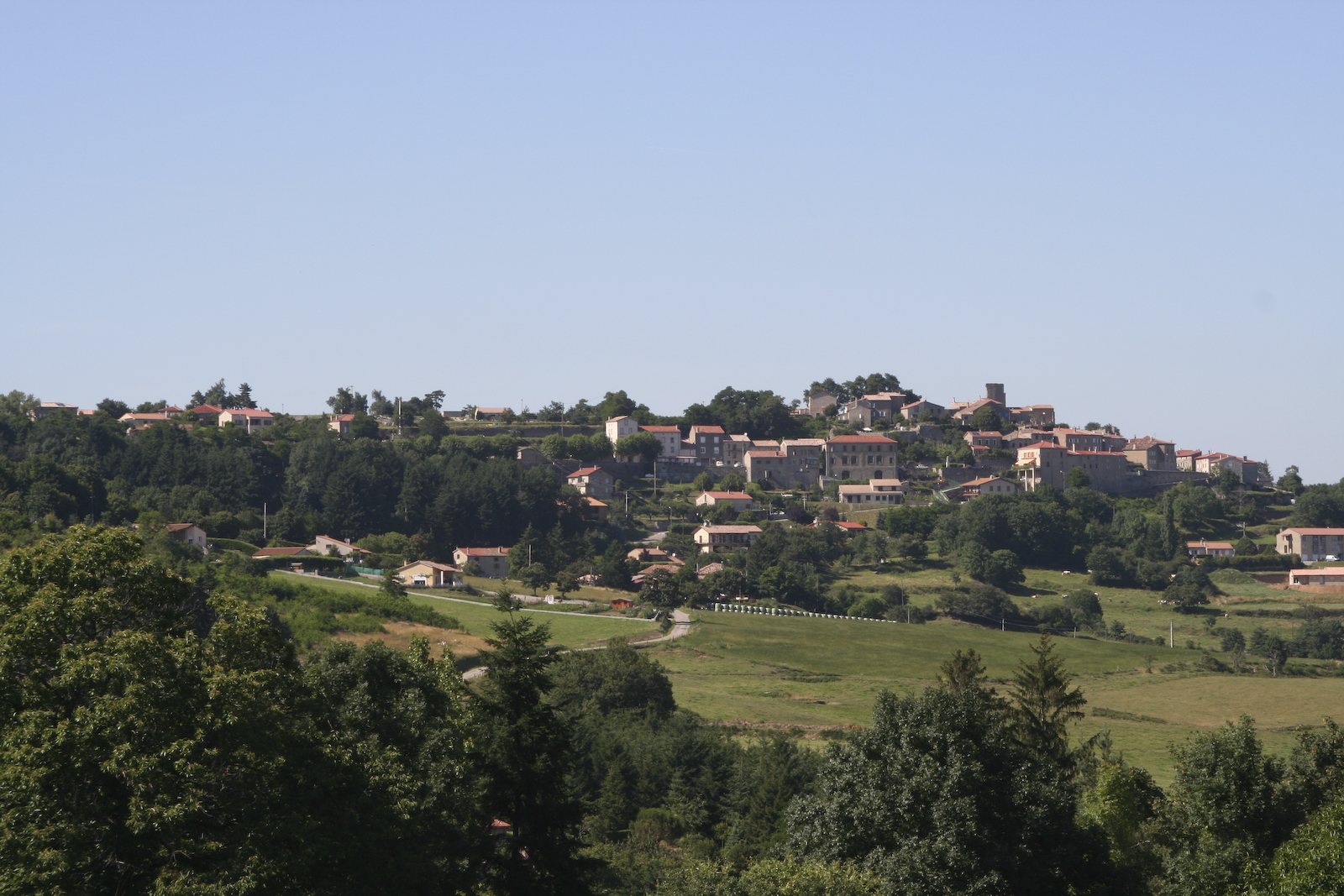
- A general view of Boffres
- Location of Boffres
- Location within France Location within Auvergne-Rhône-Alpes
- Coordinates: 44°55′16″N 4°42′12″E
- Country: France
- Region: Auvergne-Rhône-Alpes
- Department: Ardèche
- Arrondissement: Tournon-sur-Rhône
- Canton: Rhône-Eyrieux

Government
  - Mayor (2020–2026): Hubert Juge
- Area^{1}: 30.10 km^{2} (11.62 sq mi)
- Highest elevation: 782 m (2,566 ft)
- Lowest elevation: 375 m (1,230 ft)
- Population (2023): 633
  - Density: 21.0/km^{2} (54.5/sq mi)
- Time zone: UTC+01:00 (CET)
  - Summer (DST): UTC+02:00 (CEST)
- INSEE/Postal code: 07035 /07440
- ^{1} French Land Register data, which excludes lakes, ponds, glaciers > 1 km^{2} (0.386 sq mi or 247 acres) and river estuaries.

Boffres (French pronunciation: [bɔfʁ]; Occitan: Bofres) is a commune in the Ardèche department in southern France.

== See also ==
- Communes of the Ardèche department
