= Saint-André-en-Vivarais =

- Commune
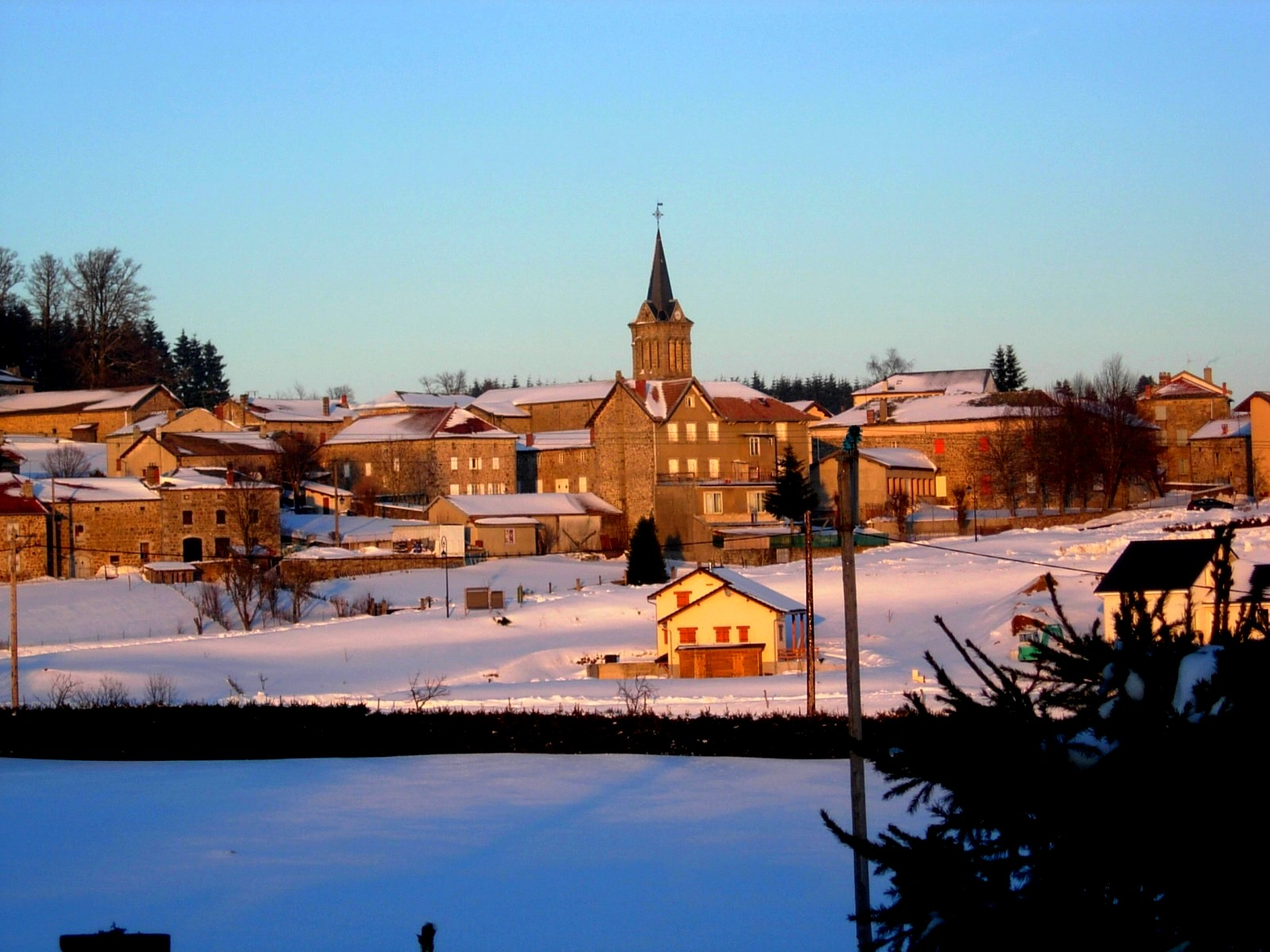
- The church and surrounding buildings in winter
- Location of Saint-André-en-Vivarais
- Location within France Location within Auvergne-Rhône-Alpes
- Coordinates: 45°07′19″N 4°24′43″E
- Country: France
- Region: Auvergne-Rhône-Alpes
- Department: Ardèche
- Arrondissement: Tournon-sur-Rhône
- Canton: Haut-Eyrieux

Government
  - Mayor (2020–2026): Antoine Cavroy
- Area^{1}: 20.48 km^{2} (7.91 sq mi)
- Elevation: 1,046 m (3,432 ft)
- Highest elevation: 1,205 m (3,953 ft)
- Lowest elevation: 687 m (2,254 ft)
- Population (2023): 212
  - Density: 10.4/km^{2} (26.8/sq mi)
- Time zone: UTC+01:00 (CET)
  - Summer (DST): UTC+02:00 (CEST)
- INSEE/Postal code: 07212 /07690
- ^{1} French Land Register data, which excludes lakes, ponds, glaciers > 1 km^{2} (0.386 sq mi or 247 acres) and river estuaries.

Saint-André-en-Vivarais (French pronunciation: [sɛ̃.t‿ɑ̃dʁe ɑ̃ vivaʁɛ], literally Saint-André in Vivarais; Occitan: Sant Andrieu daus Enfanjats) is a commune in the Ardèche department in southern France.

== Population ==
Historical population
Year	Pop.	±% p.a.
1968	408	—
1975	319	−3.45%
1982	255	−3.15%
1990	213	−2.22%
1999	235	+1.10%
2007	229	−0.32%
2012	220	−0.80%
2017	213	−0.64%
2023	212	−0.08%
Source: INSEE

== See also ==
- Communes of the Ardèche department
