= Hector de Soubeyran de Saint-Prix =

French politician

- Born: July 2, 1756; Saint-Péray, Ardèche, France
- Died: September 2, 1828 (aged 72); Saint-Péray, Ardèche, France
- Occupation: Politician

Hector de Soubeyran de Saint-Prix (July 2, 1756 – September 2, 1828) was a French politician. He served as a member of the National Assembly from 1791 to 1792, the National Convention from 1792 to 1795, and the Council of Five Hundred from 1795 to 1799.
