= Gilhoc-sur-Ormèze =

- Commune
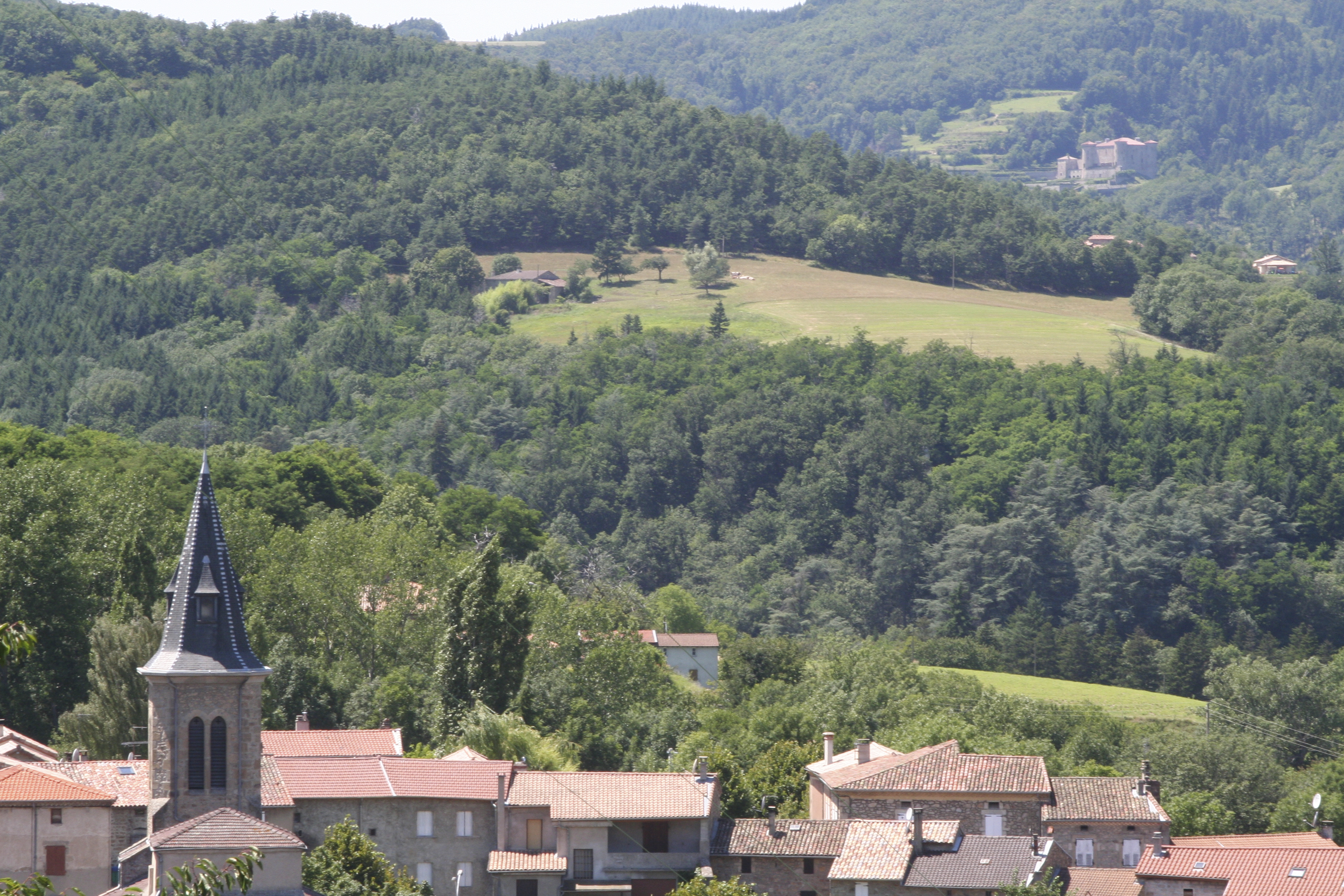
- A general view of Gilhoc-sur-Ormèze
- Location of Gilhoc-sur-Ormèze
- Location within France Location within Auvergne-Rhône-Alpes
- Coordinates: 44°59′14″N 4°41′19″E
- Country: France
- Region: Auvergne-Rhône-Alpes
- Department: Ardèche
- Arrondissement: Tournon-sur-Rhône
- Canton: Haut-Vivarais

Government
  - Mayor (2020–2026): Amédée Blanc
- Area^{1}: 20.74 km^{2} (8.01 sq mi)
- Elevation: 500 m (1,600 ft)
- Highest elevation: 846 m (2,776 ft)
- Lowest elevation: 411 m (1,348 ft)
- Population (2023): 470
  - Density: 23/km^{2} (59/sq mi)
- Time zone: UTC+01:00 (CET)
  - Summer (DST): UTC+02:00 (CEST)
- INSEE/Postal code: 07095 /07270
- ^{1} French Land Register data, which excludes lakes, ponds, glaciers > 1 km^{2} (0.386 sq mi or 247 acres) and river estuaries.

Gilhoc-sur-Ormèze is a commune in the Ardèche department in southern France.

== Population ==
Historical population
| Year | Pop. | ±% p.a. |
|---|---|---|
| 1968 | 604 | — |
| 1975 | 507 | −2.47% |
| 1982 | 509 | +0.06% |
| 1990 | 433 | −2.00% |
| 1999 | 387 | −1.24% |
| 2007 | 366 | −0.69% |
| 2012 | 443 | +3.89% |
| 2017 | 455 | +0.54% |
| 2023 | 470 | +0.54% |
Source: INSEE

== See also ==
- Communes of the Ardèche department
