= Saint-Thomé =

- Commune
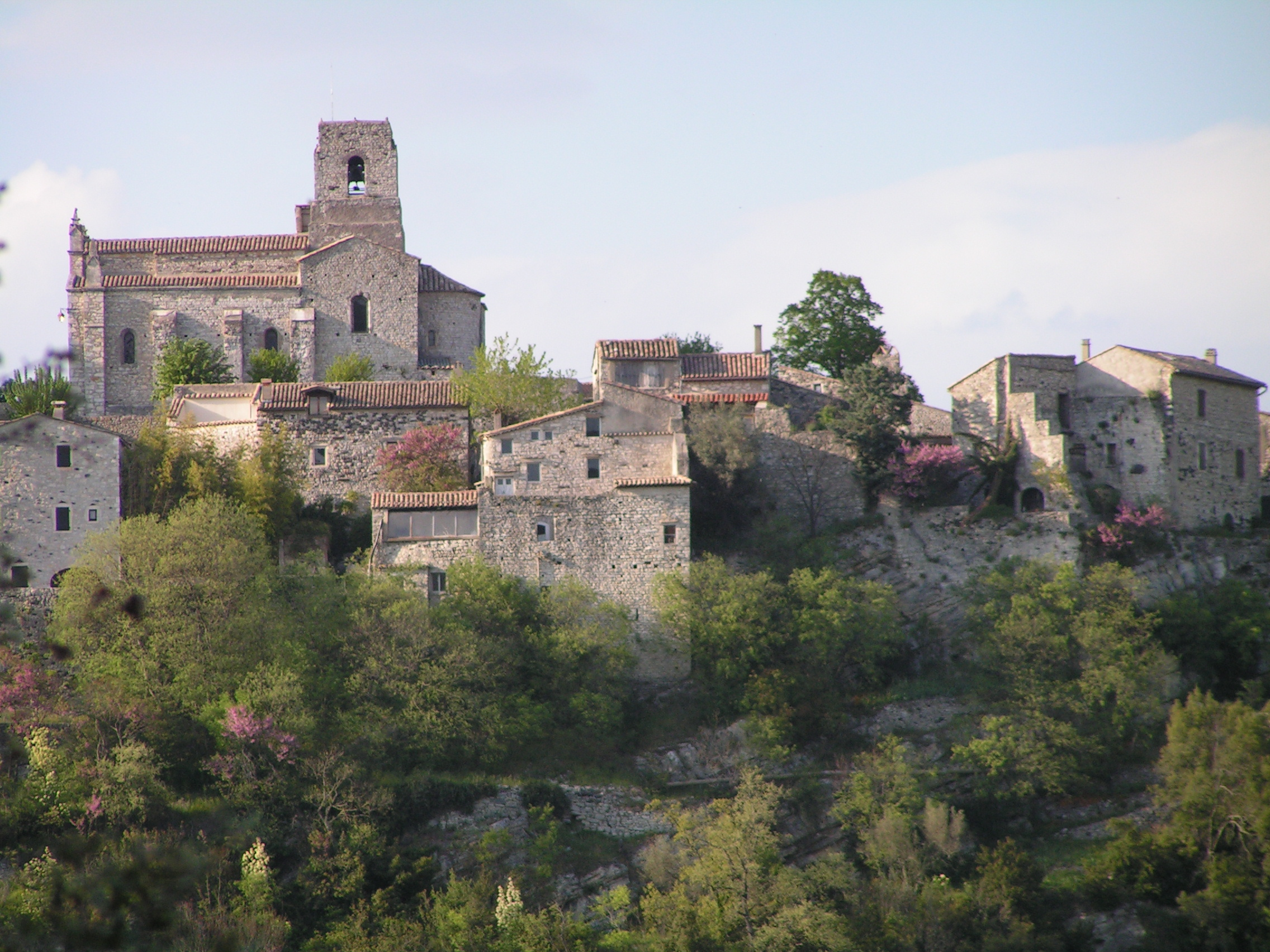
- The church and surrounding buildings in Saint-Thomé
- Location of Saint-Thomé
- Location within France Location within Auvergne-Rhône-Alpes
- Coordinates: 44°30′05″N 4°37′36″E
- Country: France
- Region: Auvergne-Rhône-Alpes
- Department: Ardèche
- Arrondissement: Privas
- Canton: Berg-Helvie

Government
  - Mayor (2020–2026): Gilbert Petitjean
- Area^{1}: 19.65 km^{2} (7.59 sq mi)
- Elevation: 67 m (220 ft)
- Highest elevation: 380 m (1,250 ft)
- Lowest elevation: 93 m (305 ft)
- Population (2023): 480
  - Density: 24/km^{2} (63/sq mi)
- Time zone: UTC+01:00 (CET)
  - Summer (DST): UTC+02:00 (CEST)
- INSEE/Postal code: 07300 /07220
- ^{1} French Land Register data, which excludes lakes, ponds, glaciers > 1 km^{2} (0.386 sq mi or 247 acres) and river estuaries.

Saint-Thomé (French pronunciation: [sɛ̃ tɔme]; Occitan: Sant Thomé) is a commune in the Ardèche department in southern France.

== History ==
Saint-Thomé can be traced back to the Gallo-Roman period, with the earliest mention of the village recorded in the 6th century.

== Population ==
Historical population
| Year | Pop. | ±% p.a. |
|---|---|---|
| 1968 | 288 | — |
| 1975 | 245 | −2.28% |
| 1982 | 257 | +0.69% |
| 1990 | 285 | +1.30% |
| 1999 | 358 | +2.57% |
| 2007 | 386 | +0.95% |
| 2012 | 432 | +2.28% |
| 2017 | 445 | +0.59% |
| 2023 | 480 | +1.27% |
Source: INSEE

== See also ==
- Communes of the Ardèche department
