= Joannas =

- Commune
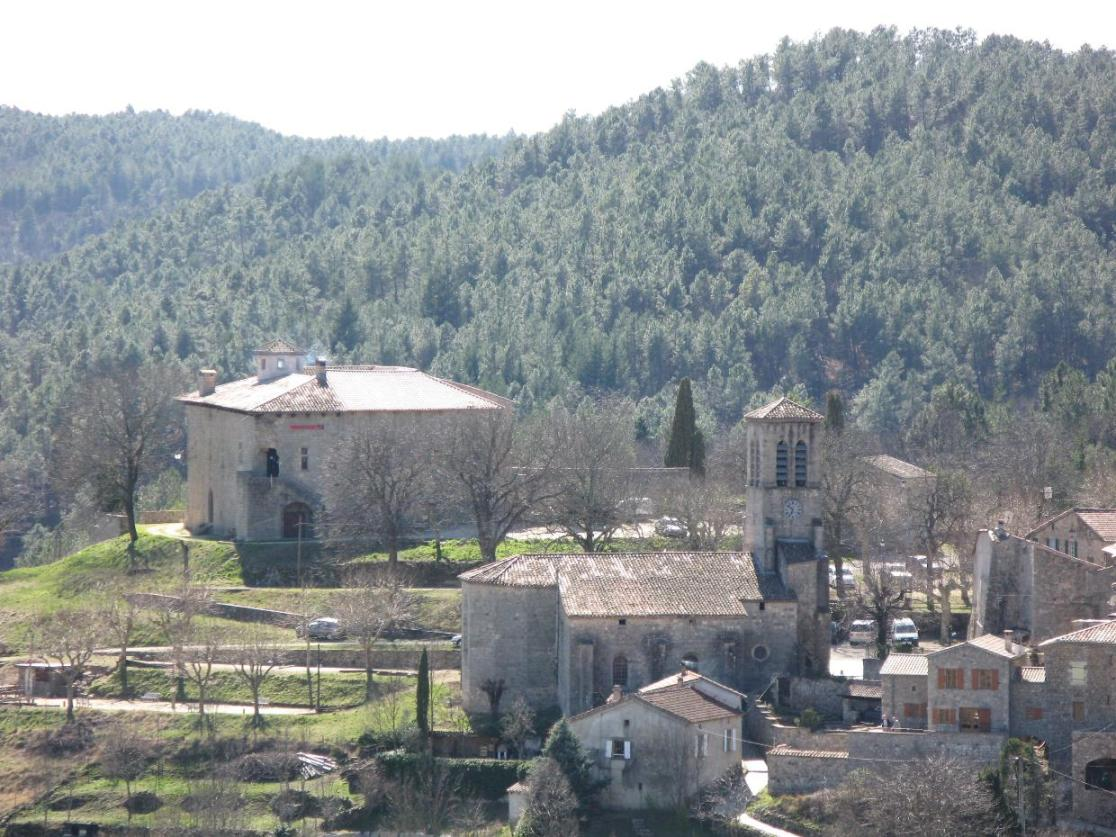
- The church and surroundings in Joannas

- Coat of arms
- Location of Joannas
- Location within France Location within Auvergne-Rhône-Alpes
- Coordinates: 44°33′59″N 4°15′09″E
- Country: France
- Region: Auvergne-Rhône-Alpes
- Department: Ardèche
- Arrondissement: Largentière
- Canton: Vallon-Pont-d'Arc
- Intercommunality: Val de Ligne

Government
  - Mayor (2020–2026): Bernard Vedovato
- Area^{1}: 11.93 km^{2} (4.61 sq mi)
- Elevation: 400 m (1,300 ft)
- Highest elevation: 1,207 m (3,960 ft)
- Lowest elevation: 309 m (1,014 ft)
- Population (2023): 328
  - Density: 27.5/km^{2} (71.2/sq mi)
- Time zone: UTC+01:00 (CET)
  - Summer (DST): UTC+02:00 (CEST)
- INSEE/Postal code: 07109 /07110
- ^{1} French Land Register data, which excludes lakes, ponds, glaciers > 1 km^{2} (0.386 sq mi or 247 acres) and river estuaries.

Joannas is a commune in the Ardèche department in southern France.

== Population ==
Historical population
Year	Pop.	±% p.a.
1968	249	—
1975	191	−3.72%
1982	214	+1.64%
1990	224	+0.57%
1999	304	+3.45%
2007	331	+1.07%
2012	315	−0.99%
2017	302	−0.84%
2023	328	+1.39%
Source: INSEE

== Monuments and places ==
There are two castles at Joannas: the castle of Logères was built in the 12th century. The castle of Joannas which contains the town hall, was inscribed in 1985 as an historical monument.

The church is named Notre-Dame de l'Annonciation.

== See also ==
- Communes of the Ardèche department
