= Sanilhac, Ardèche =

Sanilhac
- Commune
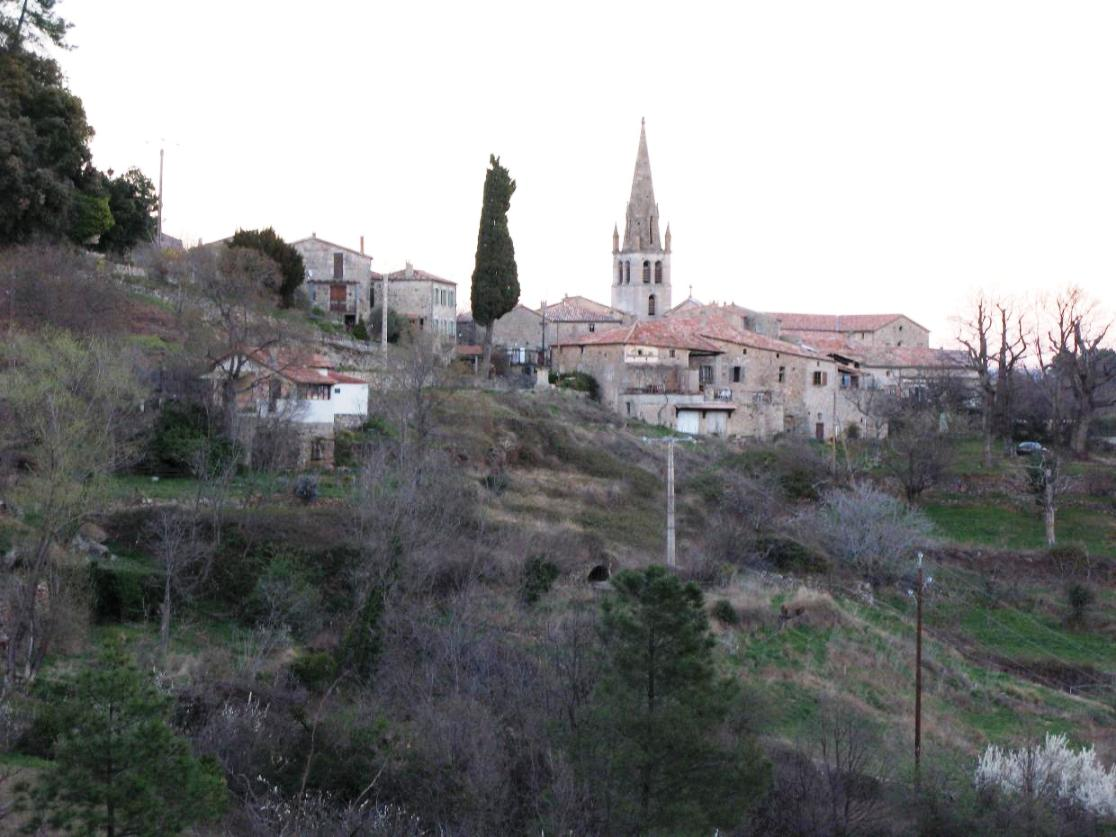
- A general view of Sanilhac
- Location of Sanilhac
- Location within France Location within Auvergne-Rhône-Alpes
- Coordinates: 44°32′12″N 4°15′02″E
- Country: France
- Region: Auvergne-Rhône-Alpes
- Department: Ardèche
- Arrondissement: Largentière
- Canton: Vallon-Pont-d'Arc
- Intercommunality: Val de Ligne

Government
  - Mayor (2020–2026): Bernard Boiron
- Area^{1}: 20.95 km^{2} (8.09 sq mi)
- Elevation: 450 m (1,480 ft)
- Highest elevation: 781 m (2,562 ft)
- Lowest elevation: 185 m (607 ft)
- Population (2023): 437
  - Density: 20.9/km^{2} (54.0/sq mi)
- Time zone: UTC+01:00 (CET)
  - Summer (DST): UTC+02:00 (CEST)
- INSEE/Postal code: 07307 /07110
- ^{1} French Land Register data, which excludes lakes, ponds, glaciers > 1 km^{2} (0.386 sq mi or 247 acres) and river estuaries.

Sanilhac (French pronunciation: [sanijak]) is a commune in the Ardèche department in southern France.

== Population ==
Historical population
Year	Pop.	±% p.a.
1968	277	—
1975	243	−1.85%
1982	291	+2.61%
1990	343	+2.08%
1999	346	+0.10%
2007	378	+1.11%
2012	432	+2.71%
2017	446	+0.64%
2023	437	−0.34%
Source: INSEE

== See also ==
- Communes of the Ardèche department
