= Morancé =

- Commune
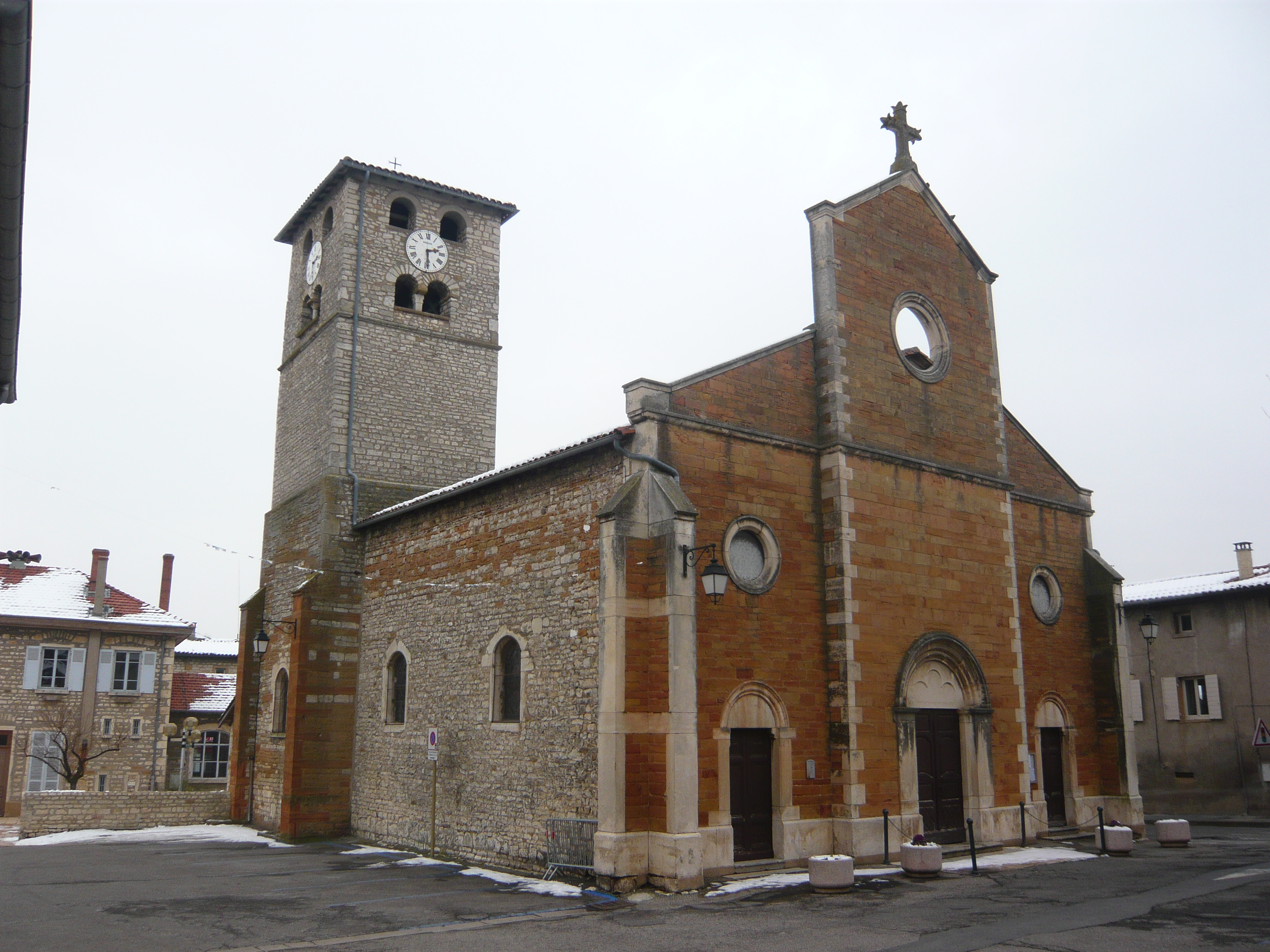
- Morancé's church

- Coat of arms
- Location of Morancé
- Location within France Location within Auvergne-Rhône-Alpes
- Coordinates: 45°54′00″N 4°42′00″E
- Country: France
- Region: Auvergne-Rhône-Alpes
- Department: Rhône
- Arrondissement: Villefranche-sur-Saône
- Canton: Anse
- Intercommunality: Beaujolais-Pierres-Dorées

Government
  - Mayor (2020–2026): Claire Peigné
- Area^{1}: 9.25 km^{2} (3.57 sq mi)
- Elevation: 236 m (774 ft)
- Highest elevation: 401 m (1,316 ft)
- Lowest elevation: 174 m (571 ft)
- Population (2023): 2,261
  - Density: 244/km^{2} (633/sq mi)
- Time zone: UTC+01:00 (CET)
  - Summer (DST): UTC+02:00 (CEST)
- INSEE/Postal code: 69140 /69480
- ^{1} French Land Register data, which excludes lakes, ponds, glaciers > 1 km^{2} (0.386 sq mi or 247 acres) and river estuaries.

Morancé (French pronunciation: [mɔʁɑ̃se]) is a commune in the Rhône department in eastern France.

== Population ==
Historical population
Year	Pop.	±% p.a.
1968	690	—
1975	882	+3.57%
1982	1,365	+6.44%
1990	1,387	+0.20%
1999	1,687	+2.20%
2007	2,005	+2.18%
2012	2,104	+0.97%
2017	1,970	−1.31%
2023	2,261	+2.32%
Source: INSEE

== See also ==
- Communes of the Rhône department
