= Désaignes =

- Commune
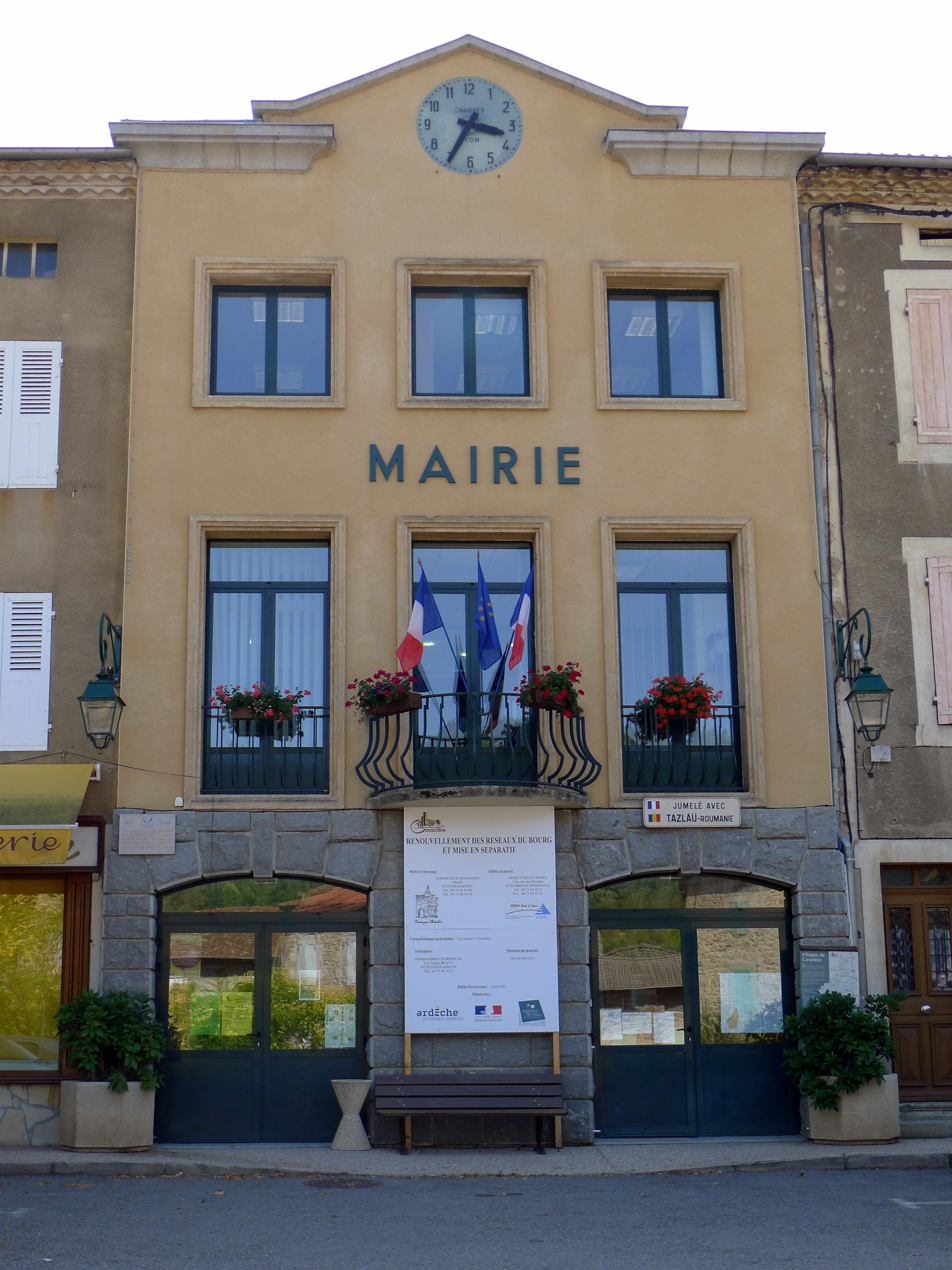
- The town hall in Désaignes
- Location of Désaignes
- Location within France Location within Auvergne-Rhône-Alpes
- Coordinates: 44°59′44″N 4°31′03″E
- Country: France
- Region: Auvergne-Rhône-Alpes
- Department: Ardèche
- Arrondissement: Tournon-sur-Rhône
- Canton: Haut-Vivarais

Government
  - Mayor (2020–2026): François Soubeyrand
- Area^{1}: 50.72 km^{2} (19.58 sq mi)
- Elevation: 500 m (1,600 ft)
- Highest elevation: 1,170 m (3,840 ft)
- Lowest elevation: 380 m (1,250 ft)
- Population (2023): 1,151
  - Density: 22.69/km^{2} (58.78/sq mi)
- Time zone: UTC+01:00 (CET)
  - Summer (DST): UTC+02:00 (CEST)
- INSEE/Postal code: 07079 /07570
- ^{1} French Land Register data, which excludes lakes, ponds, glaciers > 1 km^{2} (0.386 sq mi or 247 acres) and river estuaries.

Désaignes (French pronunciation: [dezɛɲ]; Occitan: Desanha) is a commune in the Ardèche department in the Auvergne-Rhône-Alpes region in southern France.

== Population ==
Historical population
Year	Pop.	±% p.a.
1968	1,482	—
1975	1,284	−2.03%
1982	1,182	−1.18%
1990	1,087	−1.04%
1999	1,105	+0.18%
2007	1,164	+0.65%
2012	1,166	+0.03%
2017	1,111	−0.96%
2023	1,151	+0.59%
Source: INSEE

== See also ==
- Communes of the Ardèche department
