= Mirabel, Ardèche =

Mirabel
- Commune
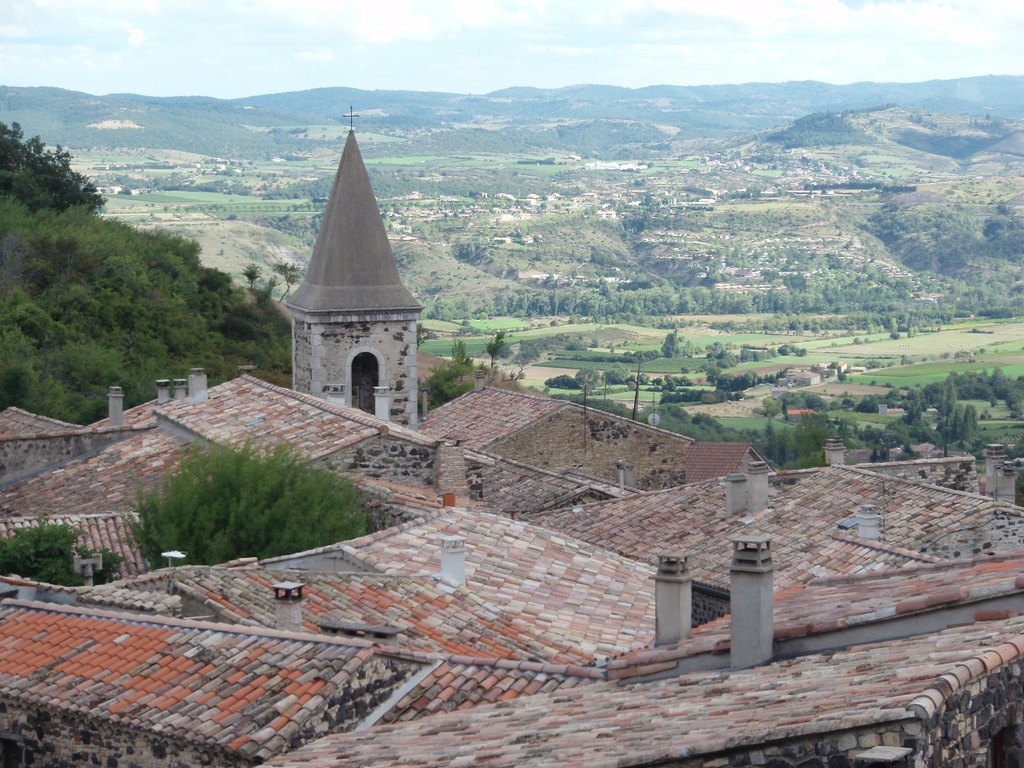
- A view across the rooftops in Mirabel
- Location of Mirabel
- Location within France Location within Auvergne-Rhône-Alpes
- Coordinates: 44°36′34″N 4°29′55″E
- Country: France
- Region: Auvergne-Rhône-Alpes
- Department: Ardèche
- Arrondissement: Largentière
- Canton: Berg-Helvie
- Intercommunality: Berg et Coiron

Government
  - Mayor (2020–2026): Gilbert Marcon
- Area^{1}: 19.9 km^{2} (7.7 sq mi)
- Elevation: 500 m (1,600 ft)
- Highest elevation: 685 m (2,247 ft)
- Lowest elevation: 210 m (690 ft)
- Population (2023): 769
  - Density: 38.6/km^{2} (100/sq mi)
- Time zone: UTC+01:00 (CET)
  - Summer (DST): UTC+02:00 (CEST)
- INSEE/Postal code: 07159 /07170
- ^{1} French Land Register data, which excludes lakes, ponds, glaciers > 1 km^{2} (0.386 sq mi or 247 acres) and river estuaries.

Mirabel (French pronunciation: [miʁabɛl]; Occitan: Mirabèu) is a commune in the Ardèche department in southern France.

== Population ==
Historical population
Year	Pop.	±% p.a.
1968	310	—
1975	285	−1.19%
1982	288	+0.15%
1990	293	+0.22%
1999	314	+0.77%
2007	369	+2.04%
2012	513	+6.81%
2017	654	+4.98%
2023	769	+2.74%
Source: INSEE

== See also ==
- Communes of the Ardèche department
