= Vinezac =

- Commune
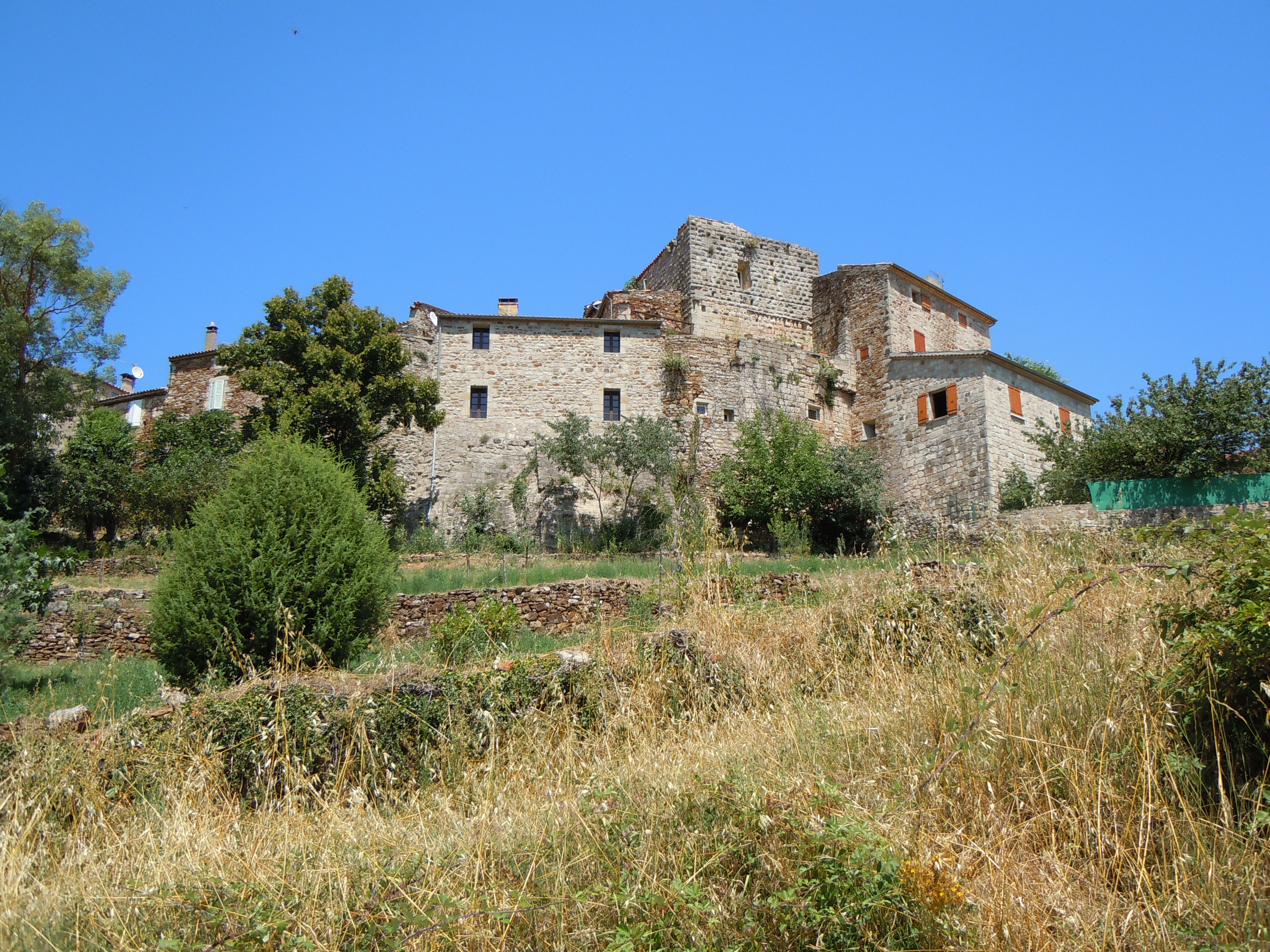
- The chateau in Vinezac
- Location of Vinezac
- Location within France Location within Auvergne-Rhône-Alpes
- Coordinates: 44°32′21″N 4°19′33″E
- Country: France
- Region: Auvergne-Rhône-Alpes
- Department: Ardèche
- Arrondissement: Largentière
- Canton: Aubenas-2
- Intercommunality: Bassin d'Aubenas

Government
  - Mayor (2020–2026): André Laurent
- Area^{1}: 10.91 km^{2} (4.21 sq mi)
- Elevation: 228 m (748 ft)
- Highest elevation: 450 m (1,480 ft)
- Lowest elevation: 159 m (522 ft)
- Population (2023): 1,378
  - Density: 126.3/km^{2} (327.1/sq mi)
- Time zone: UTC+01:00 (CET)
  - Summer (DST): UTC+02:00 (CEST)
- INSEE/Postal code: 07343 /07110
- ^{1} French Land Register data, which excludes lakes, ponds, glaciers > 1 km^{2} (0.386 sq mi or 247 acres) and river estuaries.

Vinezac (French pronunciation: [vinzak]; Occitan: Vinasac) is a commune in the Ardèche department in southern France.

== Population ==
Historical population
| Year | Pop. | ±% p.a. |
|---|---|---|
| 1968 | 551 | — |
| 1975 | 571 | +0.51% |
| 1982 | 686 | +2.66% |
| 1990 | 856 | +2.81% |
| 1999 | 989 | +1.62% |
| 2007 | 1,144 | +1.84% |
| 2012 | 1,300 | +2.59% |
| 2017 | 1,371 | +1.07% |
| 2023 | 1,378 | +0.08% |
Source: INSEE

== See also ==
- Côtes du Vivarais AOC
- Communes of the Ardèche department
