= Château des Chances =

Ruined castle in Les Haies, Rhône, France

Coordinates: 45°31′00″N 4°43′00″E

The Château des Chances is a ruined castle in the commune of Les Haies in the Rhône département of France, at the foot of the Pilat massif.

All that remains today of the medieval castle is a collapsed tower and some stretches of wall. The oldest remnant is from a castle mentioned in a charter in April 970 (the Charte Savigny) naming a certain Rudolph, a son of the powerful Lavieu family, as owner of the castle.

== See also ==
- List of castles in France
