= Arbusigny =

Arbusigny Arboznyi (Savoyard)
- Commune
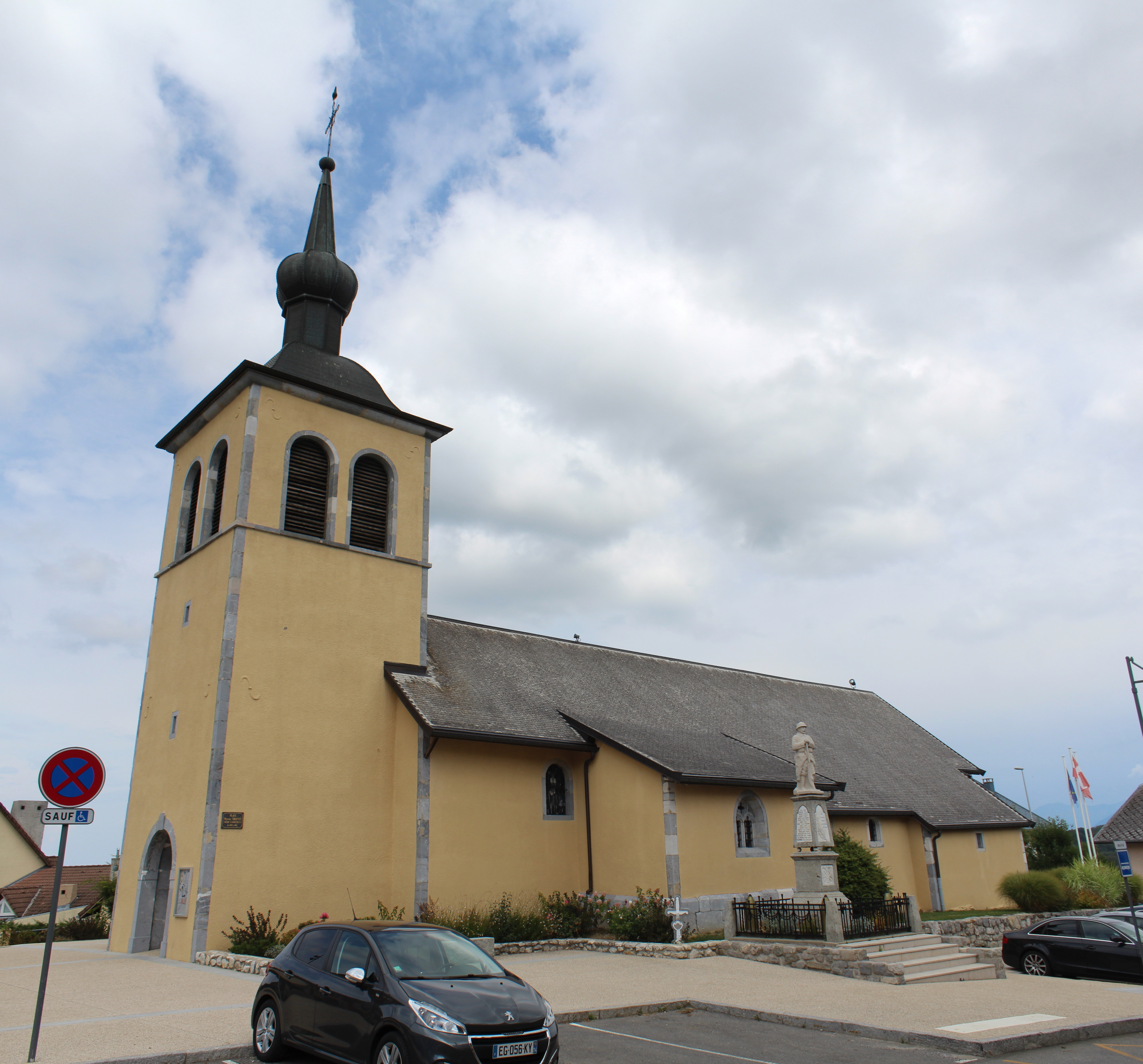
- Saint-Jean-Baptiste church

- Coat of arms
- Location of Arbusigny
- Location within France Location within Auvergne-Rhône-Alpes
- Coordinates: 46°05′33″N 6°13′08″E
- Country: France
- Region: Auvergne-Rhône-Alpes
- Department: Haute-Savoie
- Arrondissement: Saint-Julien-en-Genevois
- Canton: La Roche-sur-Foron
- Intercommunality: CC Arve et Salève

Government
  - Mayor (2020–2026): Régine Rémillon
- Area^{1}: 12.25 km^{2} (4.73 sq mi)
- Highest elevation: 964 m (3,163 ft)
- Lowest elevation: 675 m (2,215 ft)
- Population (2023): 1,167
  - Density: 95.27/km^{2} (246.7/sq mi)
- Time zone: UTC+01:00 (CET)
  - Summer (DST): UTC+02:00 (CEST)
- INSEE/Postal code: 74015 /74930
- ^{1} French Land Register data, which excludes lakes, ponds, glaciers > 1 km^{2} (0.386 sq mi or 247 acres) and river estuaries.

Arbusigny (French pronunciation: [aʁbyziɲi]; Savoyard: Arboznyi) is a commune in the Haute-Savoie department in the Auvergne-Rhône-Alpes region in south-eastern France.

== See also ==
- Communes of the Haute-Savoie department
