= Beausemblant =

- Commune
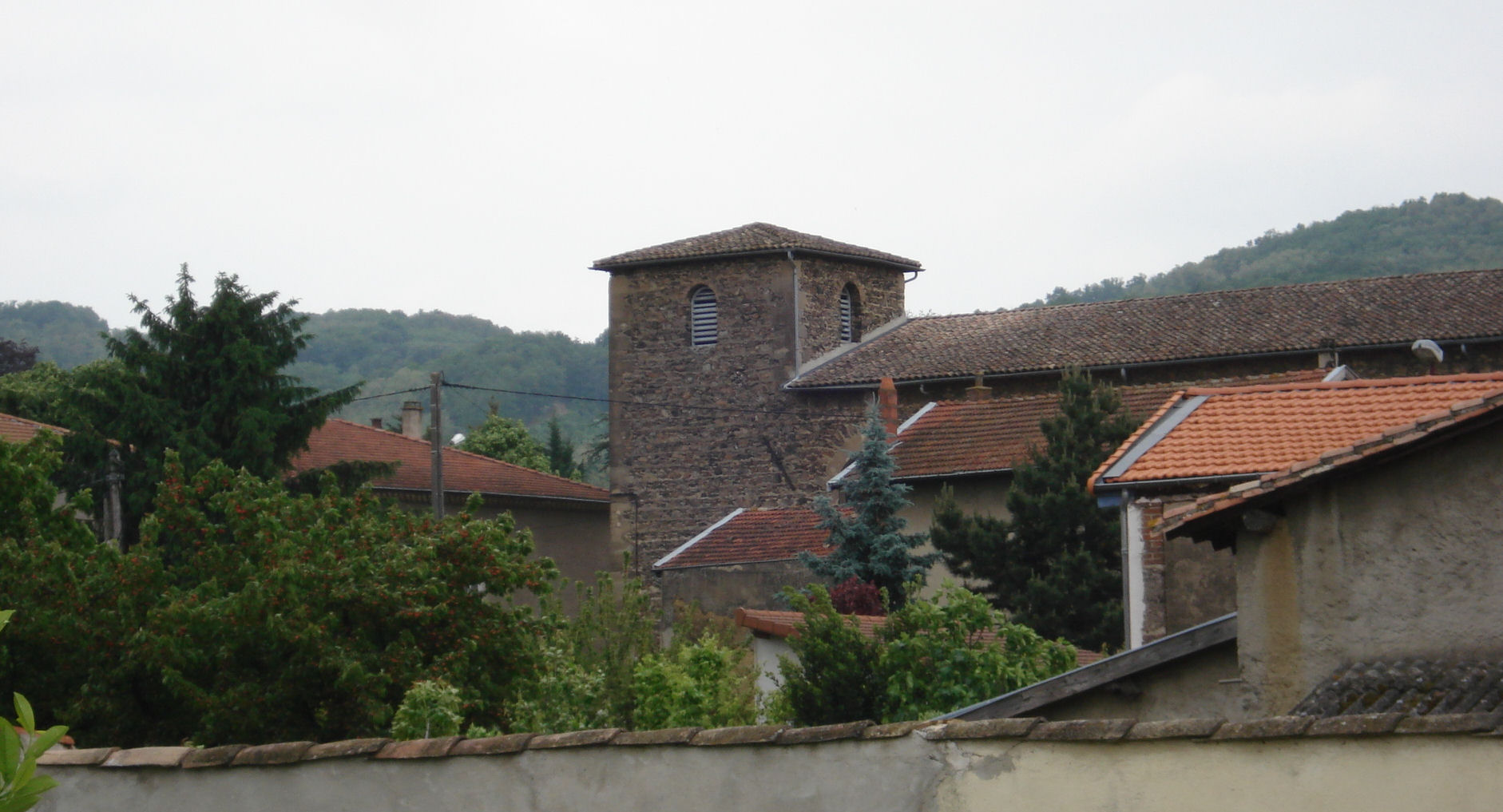
- The church and its surroundings

- Coat of arms
- Location of Beausemblant
- Location within France Location within Auvergne-Rhône-Alpes
- Coordinates: 45°13′04″N 4°49′52″E
- Country: France
- Region: Auvergne-Rhône-Alpes
- Department: Drôme
- Arrondissement: Valence
- Canton: Saint-Vallier

Government
  - Mayor (2020–2026): Jean Cesa
- Area^{1}: 11.67 km^{2} (4.51 sq mi)
- Highest elevation: 367 m (1,204 ft)
- Lowest elevation: 134 m (440 ft)
- Population (2023): 1,475
  - Density: 126.4/km^{2} (327.4/sq mi)
- Time zone: UTC+01:00 (CET)
  - Summer (DST): UTC+02:00 (CEST)
- INSEE/Postal code: 26041 /26240
- ^{1} French Land Register data, which excludes lakes, ponds, glaciers > 1 km^{2} (0.386 sq mi or 247 acres) and river estuaries.

Beausemblant (French pronunciation: [bozɑ̃blɑ̃]; Arpitan: Biôsemblent) is a commune in the Drôme department in southeastern France.

== Population ==
Historical population
Year	Pop.	±% p.a.
1968	668	—
1975	649	−0.41%
1982	762	+2.32%
1990	813	+0.81%
1999	984	+2.14%
2007	1,261	+3.15%
2012	1,349	+1.36%
2017	1,432	+1.20%
2023	1,475	+0.49%
Source: INSEE

== See also ==
- Communes of the Drôme department
