= Château de Dingy =

Castle in Auvergne-Rhône-Alpes, France

Coordinates: 45°54′39″N 6°13′14″E

The Château de Dingy was a castle in the commune of Dingy-Saint-Clair in the Haute-Savoie département of France.

== Position ==
The castle overlooks the mouth of the Bluffy pass and the valley of the Fier, facing the Château d'Alex. A circle of paving stones in the yard of the primary school marks the position of the tower. A lintel recovered from the castle has been used in an oratory at Villard Dessus.

== History ==
In the 13th century, the castle was in the hands of the Menthon family. A Monsieur Lagrange acquired it in 1815 and sold stone removed from the site.

== See also ==
- List of castles in France

== Bibliography ==
- Christian Regat, François Aubert, Châteaux de Haute-Savoie, Chablais, Faucigny, Genevois, Éd. Cabédita, 1994.
