= Ville-sur-Jarnioux =

- Commune
- A general view of Ville-sur-Jarnioux

- Coat of arms
- Location of Ville-sur-Jarnioux
- Location within France Location within Auvergne-Rhône-Alpes
- Coordinates: 45°57′45″N 4°36′32″E
- Country: France
- Region: Auvergne-Rhône-Alpes
- Department: Rhône
- Arrondissement: Villefranche-sur-Saône
- Canton: Val d'Oingt
- Intercommunality: CA Villefranche Beaujolais Saône

Government
  - Mayor (2020–2026): Gaëtan Lièvre
- Area^{1}: 10.11 km^{2} (3.90 sq mi)
- Elevation: 425 m (1,394 ft)
- Highest elevation: 773 m (2,536 ft)
- Lowest elevation: 305 m (1,001 ft)
- Population (2023): 828
  - Density: 81.9/km^{2} (212/sq mi)
- Time zone: UTC+01:00 (CET)
  - Summer (DST): UTC+02:00 (CEST)
- INSEE/Postal code: 69265 /69640
- ^{1} French Land Register data, which excludes lakes, ponds, glaciers > 1 km^{2} (0.386 sq mi or 247 acres) and river estuaries.

Ville-sur-Jarnioux is a small village and commune in eastern France. It is situated in the hills of the Beaujolais wine-growing countryside in the Rhône department of the Auvergne-Rhône-Alpes region.

== Location ==
Ville-sur-Jarnioux is part of the Pierres Dorées (golden stone) group of villages in the Beaujolais. The Pierres Dorées area comprises 38 communes where the homes and vineyard buildings were traditionally built from a local limestone rock that is naturally tinted with iron oxide, giving it a golden yellow colour. Ville-sur-Jarnioux is one a number of villages that contained an active quarry, and limited supplies of the golden stone are still quarried today. The village is surrounded by 6 other communes of Cogny to the north, Jarnioux in the valley to the east, Theizé to the south and Oingt, Saint-Laurent-d'Oingt and Sainte-Paule to the west. Ville-sur-Jarnioux is just 10 kilometres west of the A6 Autoroute du Soleil. The nearest stations on the high speed TGV train network are Macon-Loché outside Macon about 40 kilometres to the north and Part-Dieu in Lyon about the same distance to the south.

== Topography ==
The village of Ville-sur-Jarnioux is shaped in the form of a diamond of which the lowest point is to the southeast at a height of 305m and the highest point to the northwest at a height of 773m. The topography is mainly composed of hillsides occupied by vines with forests covering the crests of the hills. Around and above the village are views to the east of the nearest town of Villefranche-sur-Saône and the plain of Ain beyond. On clear days, the French Alps with Mont Blanc stretch along the horizon.

== Agriculture ==
A quarter of Ville-sur-Jarnioux's land area is cultivated and mostly taken up by vineyards that produce wine of the Beaujolais appellation. The Gamay grape is grown for red wine and the Chardonnay grape for white wine. As in some other wine-growing areas of France, the local agriculture has become more diverse with vines replaced by crops such as corn, wheat and animal feed as the nation acts to reduce excessive wine output. A small part of the land is used for grazing for goats and cattle that produce local dairy products, as well as for horses and donkeys. The quarrying of the golden stone is the only industry of historical significance in the village, other than forges and an agricultural machinery workshop that was active until the 1990s.

== Architecture ==
Church of Saint-Martin

The church of Saint-Martin dates from the 12th, 14th, 15th, 16th and 18th centuries. The original bell tower, no longer in existence, was of Romanesque origin. The choir and the nave are of vaulted construction with ogive arches in the later Gothic style. Among the records of the Abbey of Savigny in northern France is the first reference to the church in 889 and the mention of a Benedictine oratory in 995. The present church was constructed from the 12th century on the foundations of the oratory, as mentioned in the records of the Abbey of Ainay of Lyon. The church and its attached buildings were recognized by Popes Eugène III in 1153 and Innocent IV in 1250. Records of repairs carried out in 1469 and 1657 indicate that the church was placed under the patronage of Saint Martin of Tours. In 1701, the parish priest of the village, Raymond Crottet, noted the demolition of the original bell tower in the parish register. The year 1703 is engraved on a stone of the new bell tower together with the coat of arms of Gratien Ménardeau, Seigneur of Jarnioux, that became the coat of arms of the village. Serious deterioration of the church's structural fabric led to major repairs in 1987, 1991 and 2005. Inside the church, visitors can see murals painted by an anonymous Austrian during the war of 1814.

Chapel of Saint-Roch

The chapel of Saint-Roch dates from the 16th century. The Archbishop of Lyon authorized the construction of the chapel on 16 July 1522. It was initially built for prayer to ward off the plague and is dedicated to Saint Roch who had a reputation for curing the disease.

Chapel of Saint-Clair

The chapel of Saint-Clair was built between the 14th and 16th centuries. There is a possibility that the original site harboured a group of Templars in a priory that was replaced by the present chapel. Construction of the chapel appears to have begun in the 14th century at a time that coincided with the eradication of the Templar knights. It is certain that the chapel was rebuilt before 1773 as a petition dated that year mentions the work. The entrance and main façade date from the 15th and 16th centuries.

== Beaujolais Railway ==
The Beaujolais Railway (Chemin de fer du Beaujolais) no longer exists but the route of its tracks is still present on the hillsides of the village. Built in 1898 and removed in 1934, there were two lines that ran from Villefranche to Monsels and Tarare. Ville-sur-Jarnioux was on the Tarare line and the station building still exists in the village. Today the old railway line is a favourite route for hikers, ramblers and cyclists.
