= Prony =

Prony or de Prony may refer to:

- Gaspard de Prony (1755–1839), French mathematician and engineer
  - Prony's method, a mathematical method to estimate the components of a signal
  - Prony equation, hydraulics equation for fictional head loss
  - Prony series, a model of viscoelasticity
  - Prony brake, torque measurement device
- Prony Bay, bay in New Caledonia
- Prony, a city in New Caledonia, see List of cities in New Caledonia
- French corvette Prony

== See also ==
- Pronya, a river in Ryazan and Tula Oblasts in Russia
