= Oingt =

Commune in Rhône, France

- Part of Val d'Oingt
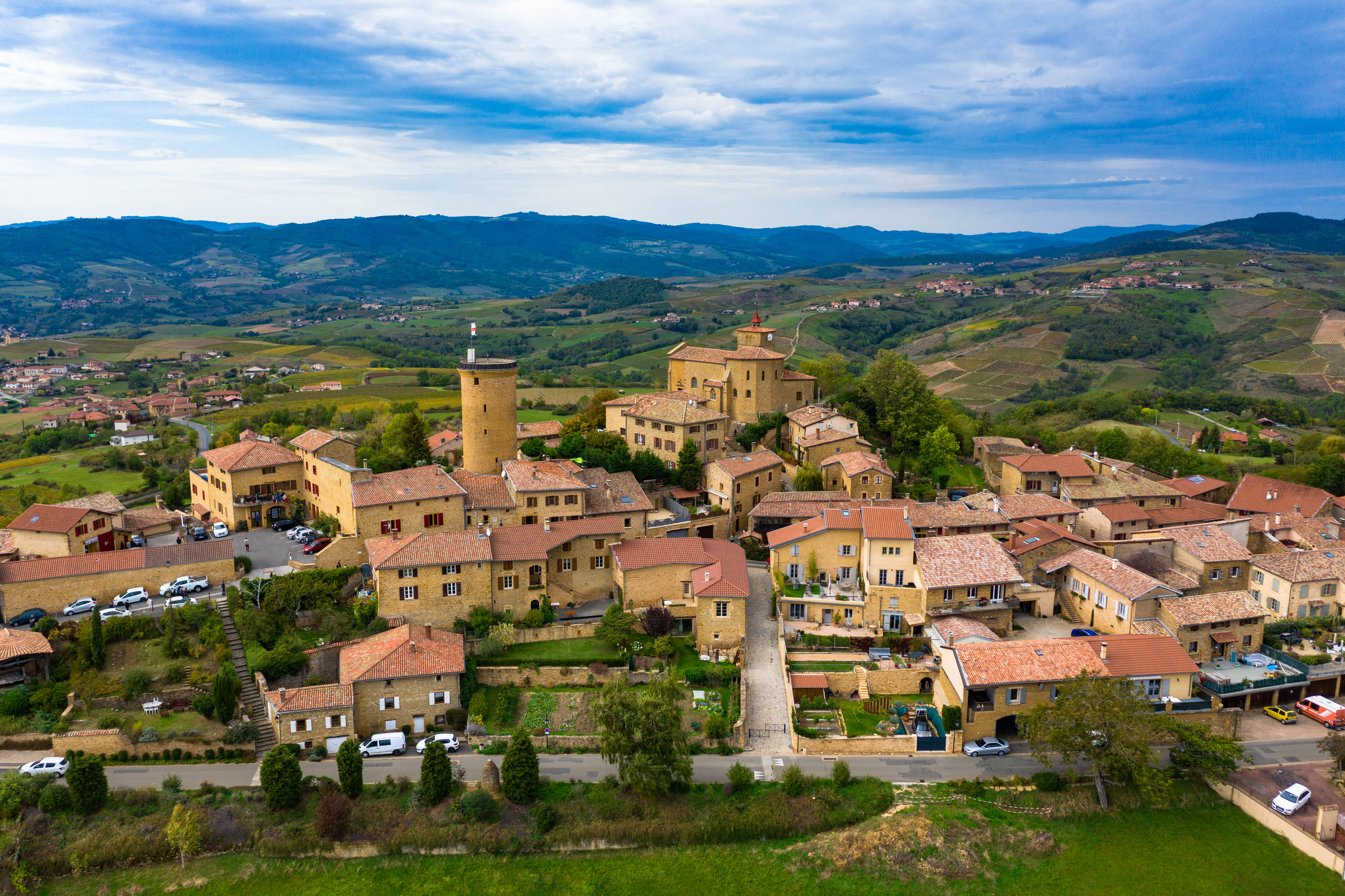
- View of the village.

- Coat of arms
- Location of Oingt
- Location within France Location within Auvergne-Rhône-Alpes
- Coordinates: 45°56′55″N 4°34′59″E
- Country: France
- Region: Auvergne-Rhône-Alpes
- Department: Rhône
- Arrondissement: Villefranche-sur-Saône
- Canton: Le Bois-d'Oingt
- Commune: Val d'Oingt
- Area^{1}: 3.92 km^{2} (1.51 sq mi)
- Elevation: 600 m (2,000 ft)
- Highest elevation: 652 m (2,139 ft)
- Lowest elevation: 358 m (1,175 ft)
- Population (2022): 676
  - Density: 172/km^{2} (447/sq mi)
- Time zone: UTC+01:00 (CET)
  - Summer (DST): UTC+02:00 (CEST)
- Postal code: 69620
- ^{1} French Land Register data, which excludes lakes, ponds, glaciers > 1 km^{2} (0.386 sq mi or 247 acres) and river estuaries.

Oingt (French pronunciation: [wɛ̃]) is a former commune in the Rhône department of the Auvergne-Rhône-Alpes region in eastern France. On 1 January 2017, Le Bois-d'Oingt, Oingt and Saint-Laurent-d'Oingt merged becoming one commune of Val d'Oingt.

It is a classified and restored mediaeval village overlooking the valley of the Azergues river and belongs to the Pays des Pierres dorées ("Golden stone country"), known for its use of local limestone containing iron oxide which gives it a distinctive golden colour. It is listed as one of the most beautiful villages of France.

== Geography ==
The village is located in the Beaujolais region, north-west of Lyon, west of Villefranche-sur-Saône and the A6 motorway. It is connected by the D120 (running north–south) to Le Bois-d'Oingt and by the D96 to Saint-Laurent-d'Oingt to the east and Theizé to the west.

=== Topography and hydrology ===
The municipal area stretches along a north–south axis over several hills. The historic village is located at the top of one of these hills at an elevation of about 520 metres. The highest point in the municipality is found on a hill to the north-east of the village, at 652 metres. Nizy Creek, whose source is to the east of the village, falls towards the south along a small valley, reaching 358 metres at the town boundary.

== Localities ==
- La Picotière
- La Gondolière
- Font-Vieille
- Le Crêt du Layet
- Les Vechères du layet
- Le Layet du haut et du bas
- Le Bourg d'en bas
- La Guillardière

== History ==
Oingt was built as a Roman castrum, named Yconium, overlooking the approach to Lyon on the Roman road from Anse to Feurs. The Romans introduced the viticulture still prevalent today in the Beaujolais region.

The first mention of the lordship of Oingt is found in the cartulary of the abbey of Savigny-en-Lyonnais. In an act of 1093 Umfred d'Oingt is mentioned, whose descendants were lords of the village until 1382.

In the thirteenth century, Guichard III, Lord of Oingt, built a motte. Several other constructions in the vicinity were also the product of this noble family, in particular the Château de Châtillon-d'Azergues and the lordship of Oingt extended well beyond the present village. Its legacy can still be seen in the numerous remnants of the thirteenth century new castle, with its Nizy Gate and its Keep, which gave control over the whole region of the Azergues valley.

The present church is the old castle chapel. It boasts gilded wooden statues and a Gothic choir where the vaults are supported by eight carved columns, which are identified with the family of Lord Guichard IV of Oingt. One of his daughters, Marguerite d'Oingt, was one of the first writers in Franco-Provençal.

Due to a lack of male descendants, the lordship of Oingt passed to the Fougères family, then in 1525 to the Châteauneuf family of Vivarais, who took the name Châteauneuf de Rochebonne.

The village of Oingt was completely destroyed in 1562 by the Baron des Adrets and this was followed by an epidemic of plague that decimated much of the population of the village.

The last lord in the line of Châteauneuf de Rochebonne was Charles-François de Châteauneuf de Rochebonne, Archbishop of Lyon from 1731 to 1740. After him, the lordship was sold.

On 26 June 1757, lightning struck the steeple, built in 1745, killing six people and striking down two hundred, forty of whom suffered injuries. Tradition says that only the priest was spared.

In the last fifty years, the village has been restored to preserve its historical treasures. The castle chapel has been the object of particular care and today, as the village church, it is known for the fine quality of the columns of the choir and its statuary. The program continues with the old 15th-century town hall (which currently houses a variety of exhibitions), the paving stones of Trayne-Cul street, one of the oldest in the village, the development and opening to the public of the Keep, the establishment of street lighting in the village, as well as the refurbishment of the town hall and the lavoir ("washhouse, public laundry"). These efforts have been rewarded with the addition of Oingt to the list of the "Most beautiful villages of France".

Below the village to the west is the château de Prony, one of whose owners was Gaspard-François-Marie-Riche de Prony (1755-1839), engineer, member (eventually president) of the French Academy of Sciences and Engineer-in-Chief of the École Nationale des Ponts et Chaussées.

Like many French towns, Oingt suffered damage during the violent storms of December 1999. The school, church and many roofs mostly west of the village were the victims of this storm which also affected forests to the northwest of the town.

== See also ==
- Communes of the Rhône department
