= Aquilair =

French ultralight aircraft manufacturer

Aquilair SA
- Company type: Privately held company
- Industry: Aerospace
- Products: Ultralight trikes
- Website: www.aquilair.com/index.php

Aquilair SA (English: Eagle Air) is a French aircraft manufacturer based in Theizé. The company specializes in the design and manufacture of ultralight trikes.

The company originally produced named trike models with specific wing and engine combinations, such as their Aquilair Swing two-seater and Aquilair Kid single-seater. By 2014 they had moved to a modular system offering any combination of their single seat carriage (Chariot Monoplace) or two seat carriage (Chariot Biplace), five models of Ipsos wings made by La Mouette, various propellers, the 48 kW (64 hp) Rotax 582 twin cylinder, inline, liquid-cooled two-stroke or the 63 kW (84 hp) Verner VM133MK two cylinder, horizontally-opposed, four-stroke engines, instruments, radios and intercoms.

== Aircraft ==
Summary of aircraft built by Aquilair
Model name	First flight	Number built	Type
Aquilair Swing			Two seat ultralight trike
Aquilair Kid			Single seat ultralight trike
Aquilair Chariot Biplace			Two seat ultralight trike
Aquilair Chariot Monoplace			Single seat ultralight trike
