= Aquilair Swing =

French ultralight trike

Swing

General information
- Type: Ultralight trike
- National origin: France
- Manufacturer: Aquilair
- Status: Production completed

The Aquilair Swing is a French ultralight trike that was designed and produced by Aquilair of Theizé. When it was available the aircraft was supplied as a complete ready-to-fly-aircraft.

As of May 2013 the Swing was no longer advertised in the company catalog of aircraft offered.

== Design and development ==
The aircraft was designed to comply with the Fédération Aéronautique Internationale microlight category, including the category's maximum gross weight of 450 kg (992 lb). The aircraft has a maximum gross weight of 405 kg (893 lb). It features a cable-braced hang glider-style high-wing, weight-shift controls, a two-seats-in-tandem open cockpit, tricycle landing gear with wheel pants on the main wheels and a single engine in pusher configuration.

The aircraft is made from metal tubing, with its double surface wing covered in Dacron sailcloth. The initial wing used was the La Mouette Swing 14, from which the aircraft takes its name. In 2010 the La Mouette Ipsos 14.9 wing was introduced instead of the Swing wing. The 9.90 m (32.5 ft) span wing is supported by a single tube-type kingpost and uses an "A" frame weight-shift control bar. The standard powerplant supplied was the twin cylinder, liquid-cooled, two-stroke, dual-ignition 64 hp (48 kW) Rotax 582, with the two cylinder, horizontally opposed 84 hp (63 kW) Verner VM133MK engine optional.

Incorporated features include rigid seats, a high engine thrust line, a low centre of gravity and elbow-height control bar and a full cockpit fairing. The aircraft has an empty weight of 155 kg (342 lb) and a gross weight of 405 kg (893 lb), giving a useful load of 250 kg (551 lb). With full fuel of 50 litres (11 imp gal; 13 US gal) the payload is 214 kg (472 lb).

== Specifications (Swing with Swing 14 wing) ==
Data from Bayerl

General characteristics

- Crew: one
- Capacity: one passenger
- Wingspan: 9.9 m (32 ft 6 in)
- Wing area: 14.9 m^{2} (160 sq ft)
- Empty weight: 155 kg (342 lb)
- Gross weight: 405 kg (893 lb)
- Fuel capacity: 50 litres (11 imp gal; 13 US gal)
- Powerplant: 1 × Rotax 582 twin cylinder, liquid-cooled, two stroke aircraft engine with "E" reduction drive, 48 kW (64 hp)
- Propellers: 3-bladed composite

Performance

- Maximum speed: 150 km/h (93 mph, 81 kn)
- Cruise speed: 90 km/h (56 mph, 49 kn)
- Stall speed: 55 km/h (34 mph, 30 kn)
- Rate of climb: 5.5 m/s (1,080 ft/min)
- Wing loading: 27.2 kg/m^{2} (5.6 lb/sq ft)
