= Nuelles =

Commune in Rhône, France

- Part of Saint-Germain-Nuelles
- Location of Nuelles
- Location within France Location within Auvergne-Rhône-Alpes
- Coordinates: 45°50′55″N 4°37′34″E
- Country: France
- Region: Auvergne-Rhône-Alpes
- Department: Rhône
- Arrondissement: Villefranche-sur-Saône
- Canton: Le Bois-d'Oingt
- Commune: Saint-Germain-Nuelles
- Area^{1}: 2.02 km^{2} (0.78 sq mi)
- Elevation: 290 m (950 ft)
- Highest elevation: 299 m (981 ft)
- Lowest elevation: 211 m (692 ft)
- Population (2022): 694
  - Density: 344/km^{2} (890/sq mi)
- Time zone: UTC+01:00 (CET)
  - Summer (DST): UTC+02:00 (CEST)
- Postal code: 69210
- ^{1} French Land Register data, which excludes lakes, ponds, glaciers > 1 km^{2} (0.386 sq mi or 247 acres) and river estuaries.

Nuelles (French pronunciation: [nɥɛl]) is a former commune in the Rhône department in Rhône-Alpes region in eastern France.

On 1 January 2013, Nuelles and Saint-Germain-sur-l'Arbresle merged becoming one commune called Saint-Germain-Nuelles.
