= Ignace Morgenstern =

Hungarian-born French film producer

- Born: 5 June 1900; Mád, Austro-Hungarian Empire
- Died: 26 January 1961 (aged 60); Paris, France
- Occupation: Producer

Ignace Morgenstern (5 June 1900 – 26 January 1961) was a Hungarian-born French film producer. He was the owner of Cocinor, one of the largest French film distributors of the 1950s.

== Career ==
Morgenstern was born in 1900 to a Jewish family in Mád, then part of the Austrian-Hungarian Empire. After emigrating to France he worked for Osso Films until the company went bankrupt in 1934. He moved to Lille where he helped establish a branch of the distributor SEDIF. In 1939 he was conscripted into the French Army. Following the Fall of France in 1940 he and his family sheltered on a farm they rented in Frontenas in the unoccupied zone of Vichy France. Following the Liberation of France in 1944 he re-established SEDIF.

In 1948 he acquired the assets of the company from Joseph Lucachevitch and established his own distribution company Cocinor, based in Paris. He concentrated in producing commercially orientated hits starring established stars such as Fernandel and Jean Gabin.

== Personal life ==
In 1927 Morgenstern married his cousin Elizabeth with whom he had a daughter Madeleine Morgenstern. Madeleine was married to the New Wave film director François Truffaut from 1957 to 1965. She met him at the Venice Film Festival while working in the publicity department of her father's company.

== Bibliography ==
- Baecque, Antoine de & Toubiana, Serge. Truffaut: A Biography. University of California Press, 2000.
- Marie, Michel. The French New Wave: An Artistic School. John Wiley & Sons, 2008.
