= Lucien Romier =

French journalist and politician

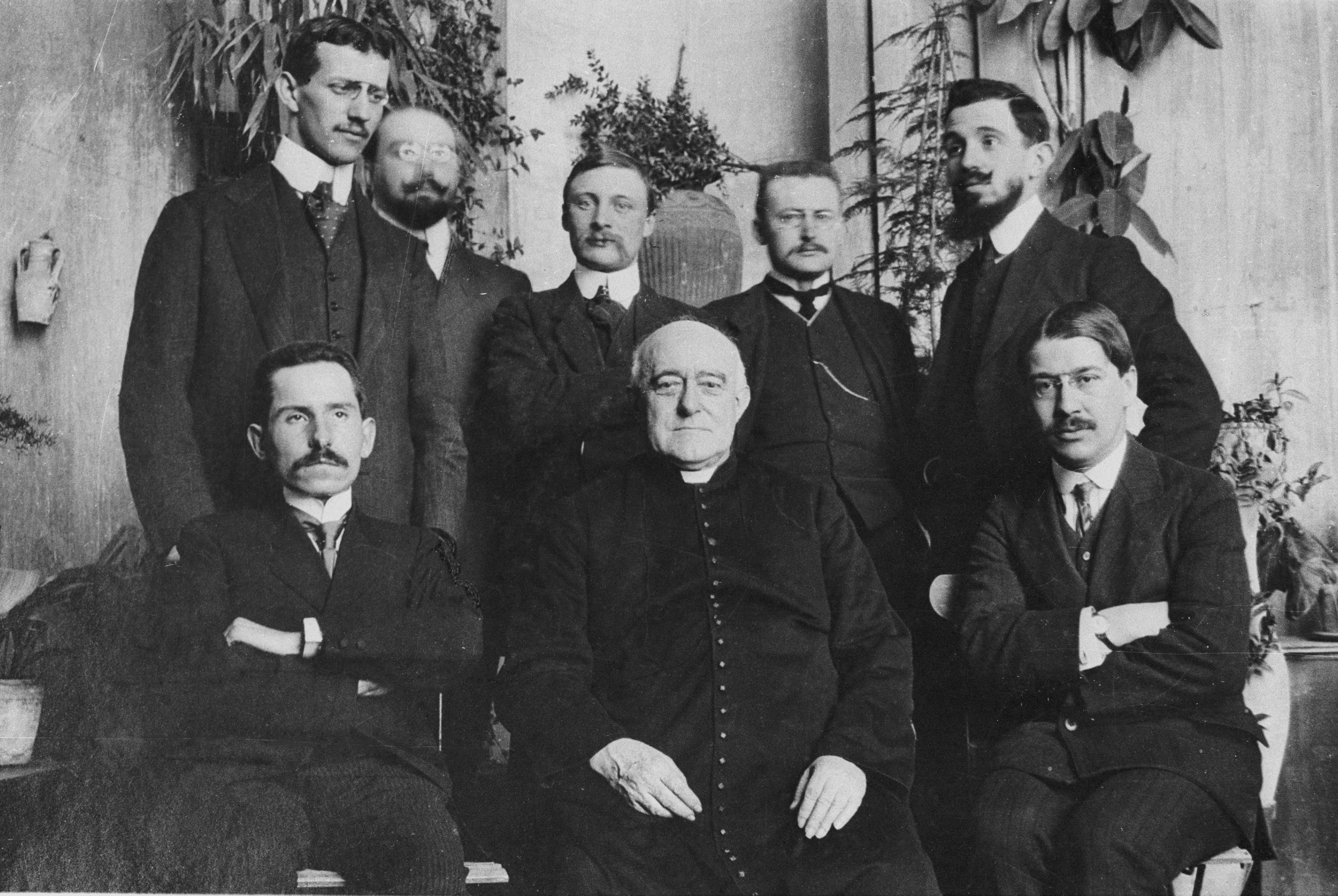
Monseigneur Louis Duchesne and his students at the Ecole Française de Rome (1911/12); Romier in the back row, second from the left

Lucien Romier (French pronunciation: [lysjɛ̃ ʁɔmje]; Moiré, 19 October 1885 – Vichy, 5 January 1944) was a French journalist and politician.

After studying at the École des Chartes where he wrote a thesis on Jacques d'Albon de Saint-André, he was a member of the French School in Rome. He made a career in journalism and was editor of the newspaper Le Figaro from 1925 to 1927 and from 1934 to 1942. In the beginning of 1941, he was an advisor of Petain and an animator of the counseil nationnal Personal friend of Pétain, he was minister of State in Laval's fourth Ministry from 18 April 1942 to 31 December 1943.

He died of a heart attack while being arrested by the Gestapo.

== Published works ==
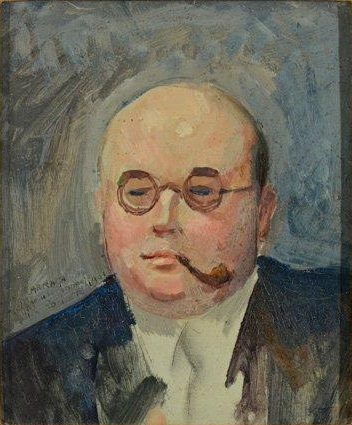
Lucien Romier painted by Ángel Zárraga

Books by Romier that have been translated into English:

- Who will be master, Europe or America? (1928); translation of Qui sera le maître, Europe ou Amérique?.
- A history of France (1953); translation of L'ancienne France, des origines à la Révolution.

Other works:

- La carrière d'un favori; Jacques d'Albon de Saint-André, maréchal de France, 1512-1562 (1909) – The career of a favorite; Jacques Dalbon, Seigneur de Saint Andre, Marshal of France, 1512–1562.
- Les origines politiques des guerres de religion (2 volumes, 1913–14) – The political origins of the wars of religion.
- Les protestants français à la veille des guerres civiles (1917) – French Protestants on the eve of civil wars.
- Le royaume de Catherine de Médicis; la France à la veille des guerres de religion (2nd edition, 1922) – The kingdom of Catherine de' Medici; France on the eve of the wars of religion.
- Catholiques et Huguenots à la cour de Charles IX (2nd edition, 1924) – Catholics and Huguenots at the court of Charles IX.
- L'Homme nouveau : esquisse des conséquences du progrès (1929) – The new man; an outline of the consequences of progress.
