= Le Bois-d'Oingt =

- Part of Val d'Oingt
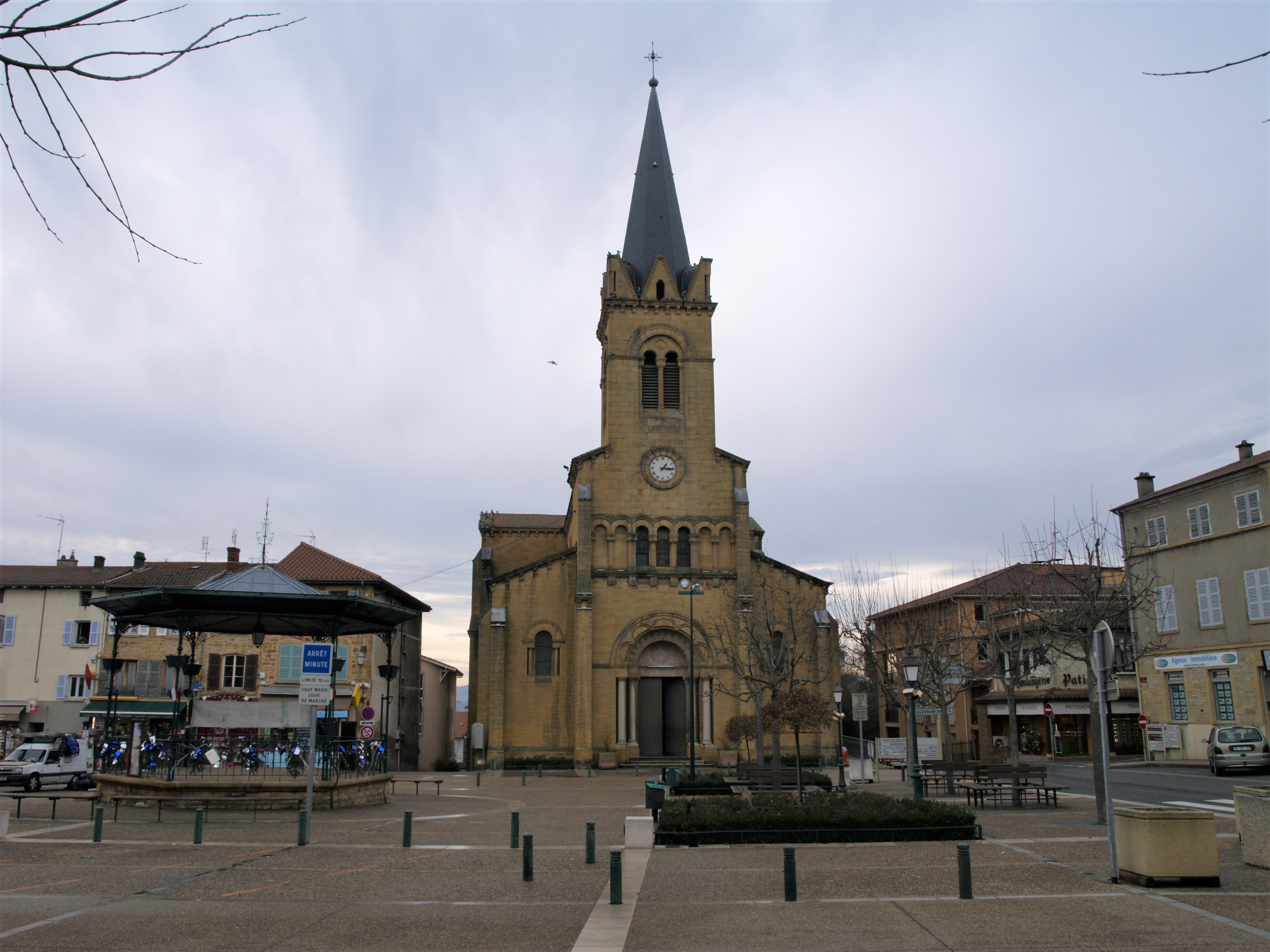
- Place de la libération in Le Bois-d'Oingt

- Coat of arms
- Location of Le Bois-d'Oingt
- Location within France Location within Auvergne-Rhône-Alpes
- Coordinates: 45°55′16″N 4°35′10″E
- Country: France
- Region: Auvergne-Rhône-Alpes
- Department: Rhône
- Arrondissement: Villefranche-sur-Saône
- Canton: Le Bois-d'Oingt
- Commune: Val d'Oingt
- Area^{1}: 5.13 km^{2} (1.98 sq mi)
- Elevation: 300 m (980 ft)
- Highest elevation: 466 m (1,529 ft)
- Lowest elevation: 250 m (820 ft)
- Population (2022): 2,592
  - Density: 505/km^{2} (1,310/sq mi)
- Demonym(s): Buisantins, Buisantines
- Time zone: UTC+01:00 (CET)
  - Summer (DST): UTC+02:00 (CEST)
- Postal code: 69620
- ^{1} French Land Register data, which excludes lakes, ponds, glaciers > 1 km^{2} (0.386 sq mi or 247 acres) and river estuaries.

Le Bois-d'Oingt (French pronunciation: [l(ə) bwa dwɛ̃]; lit. 'The Wood of Oingt') is a former commune located in the Rhône in the Auvergne-Rhône-Alpes region, in eastern France. On 1 January 2017, Le Bois-d'Oingt, Oingt and Saint-Laurent-d'Oingt merged becoming one commune of Val d'Oingt.

== Geography ==
Le Bois d'Oingt's acreage is of 1.976 square mile (512 hectares), and it lies at 350 meters altitude.

The inhabitants of Bois d’Oingt are called the “buisantins”.

== See also ==
- Communes of the Rhône department
