= Letra =

Letra may refer to:

- Létra, a commune in Rhône, France
- Letra (music genre), a North American folk music tradition
