= Saint-Germain-sur-l'Arbresle =

- Part of Saint-Germain-Nuelles
- Location of Saint-Germain-sur-l'Arbresle
- Location within France Location within Auvergne-Rhône-Alpes
- Coordinates: 45°51′11″N 4°36′43″E
- Country: France
- Region: Auvergne-Rhône-Alpes
- Department: Rhône
- Arrondissement: Villefranche-sur-Saône
- Canton: Le Bois-d'Oingt
- Commune: Saint-Germain-Nuelles
- Area^{1}: 6.52 km^{2} (2.52 sq mi)
- Elevation: 320 m (1,050 ft)
- Highest elevation: 420 m (1,380 ft)
- Lowest elevation: 259 m (850 ft)
- Population (2022): 1,558
  - Density: 239/km^{2} (619/sq mi)
- Time zone: UTC+01:00 (CET)
  - Summer (DST): UTC+02:00 (CEST)
- Postal code: 69210
- ^{1} French Land Register data, which excludes lakes, ponds, glaciers > 1 km^{2} (0.386 sq mi or 247 acres) and river estuaries.

Saint-Germain-sur-l'Arbresle (French pronunciation: [sɛ̃ ʒɛʁmɛ̃ syʁ laʁbʁɛl], literally Saint-Germain on L'Arbresle) is a former commune in the Rhône department in Rhône-Alpes region in eastern France.

On 1 January 2013, Saint-Germain-sur-l'Arbresle and Nuelles merged becoming one commune called Saint-Germain-Nuelles.

== See also ==
- Communes of the Rhône department
