= Aquilair Kid =

French ultralight trike

Kid

General information
- Type: Ultralight trike
- National origin: France
- Manufacturer: Aquilair
- Status: Production completed (2014)

The Aquilair Kid is a French ultralight trike designed and produced by Aquilair of Theizé. The aircraft is supplied as a kit for amateur construction or as a complete ready-to-fly-aircraft.

== Design and development ==
The aircraft was designed to comply with the Fédération Aéronautique Internationale microlight category, including the category's maximum gross weight of 450 kg (992 lb). The aircraft has a maximum gross weight of 300 kg (661 lb). It features a cable-braced hang glider-style high-wing, weight-shift controls, a single-seat open cockpit, tricycle landing gear and a single engine in pusher configuration.

The aircraft is made from metal tubing, with its wing covered in Dacron sailcloth. Its 9.9 m (32.5 ft) span Star 12 wing is supported by a single tube-type kingpost and uses an "A" frame weight-shift control bar. The standard powerplant is a twin cylinder, air-cooled, two-stroke, dual-ignition 50 hp (37 kW) Rotax 503 engine, with the 40 hp (30 kW) Rotax 447 and the 64 hp (48 kW) liquid-cooled Rotax 582 optional.

With the Star 12 wing the aircraft has an empty weight of 132 kg (291 lb) and a gross weight of 300 kg (661 lb), giving a useful load of 168 kg (370 lb). With full fuel of 30 litres (6.6 imp gal; 7.9 US gal) the payload is 146 kg (322 lb).

The aircraft is supplied in modular form, with the chassis, engine, reduction drive and propeller all available separately. A number of different wings can be fitted to the basic carriage, but the Star 12 was formerly the standard wing offered. The chassis incorporates an under-seat pivot system that allows the wing to be mounted and then raised into position.

== Variants ==
Kid 447
Aircraft with the twin cylinder, air-cooled, two-stroke, single-ignition 40 hp (30 kW) Rotax 447 and the 64 hp (48 kW)
Kid 503
Aircraft with the twin cylinder, air-cooled, two-stroke, dual-ignition 50 hp (37 kW) Rotax 503 engine
Kid 582
Aircraft with the twin cylinder, liquid-cooled, two-stroke, dual-ignition 64 hp (48 kW) Rotax 582 engine

== Specifications (Kid 503 with Star 12 wing) ==
Data from Bayerl

General characteristics

- Crew: one
- Wingspan: 9.9 m (32 ft 6 in)
- Wing area: 12.9 m^{2} (139 sq ft)
- Empty weight: 132 kg (291 lb)
- Gross weight: 300 kg (661 lb)
- Fuel capacity: 30 litres (6.6 imp gal; 7.9 US gal)
- Powerplant: 1 × Rotax 503 twin cylinder, air-cooled, two-stroke, dual-ignition aircraft engine, 37 kW (50 hp)
- Propellers: 2-bladed wooden

Performance

- Maximum speed: 145 km/h (90 mph, 78 kn)
- Cruise speed: 90 km/h (56 mph, 49 kn)
- Stall speed: 52 km/h (32 mph, 28 kn)
- Rate of climb: 5 m/s (980 ft/min)
- Wing loading: 23.2 kg/m^{2} (4.8 lb/sq ft)
