= Légny =

- Commune
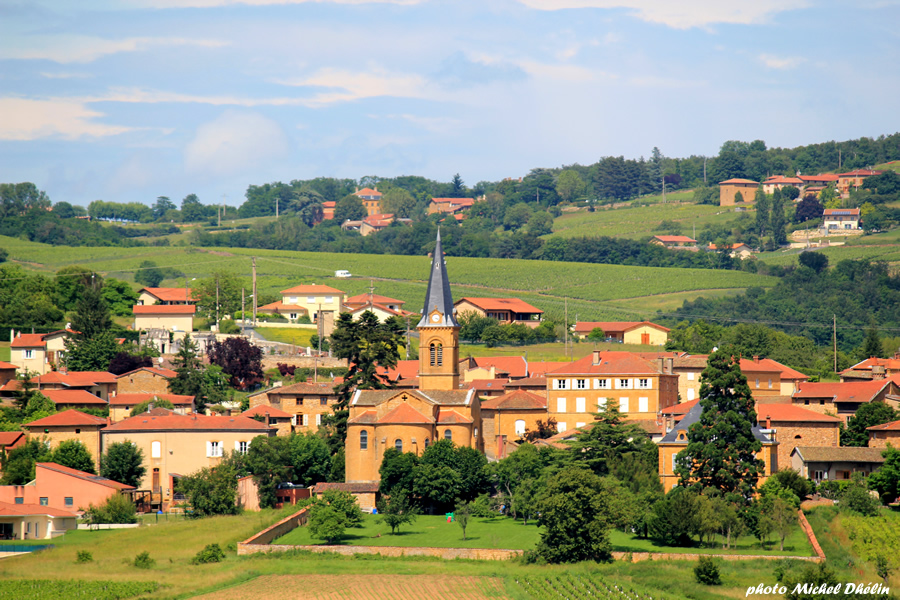
- The church and surrounding buildings in Légny

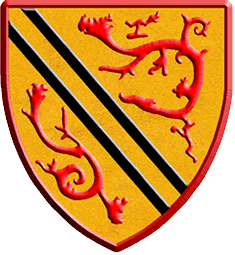
- Coat of arms
- Location of Légny
- Location within France Location within Auvergne-Rhône-Alpes
- Coordinates: 45°54′33″N 4°35′03″E
- Country: France
- Region: Auvergne-Rhône-Alpes
- Department: Rhône
- Arrondissement: Villefranche-sur-Saône
- Canton: Val d'Oingt

Government
  - Mayor (2020–2026): Sylvie Jovillard
- Area^{1}: 3.97 km^{2} (1.53 sq mi)
- Elevation: 227 m (745 ft)
- Highest elevation: 347 m (1,138 ft)
- Lowest elevation: 233 m (764 ft)
- Population (2023): 685
  - Density: 173/km^{2} (447/sq mi)
- Time zone: UTC+01:00 (CET)
  - Summer (DST): UTC+02:00 (CEST)
- INSEE/Postal code: 69111 /69620
- ^{1} French Land Register data, which excludes lakes, ponds, glaciers > 1 km^{2} (0.386 sq mi or 247 acres) and river estuaries.

Légny (French pronunciation: [leɲi]) is a commune in the Rhône department in eastern France.

== See also ==
- Communes of the Rhône department
