= Saint-Laurent-d'Oingt =

- Part of Val d'Oingt
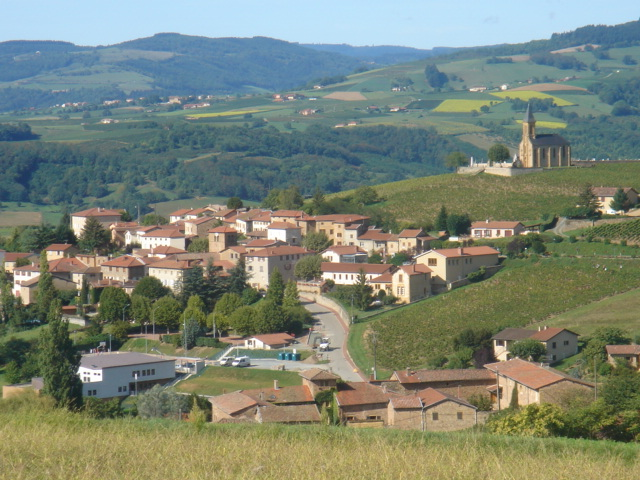
- A general view of Saint-Laurent-d'Oingt
- Location of Saint-Laurent-d'Oingt
- Location within France Location within Auvergne-Rhône-Alpes
- Coordinates: 45°56′42″N 4°33′50″E
- Country: France
- Region: Auvergne-Rhône-Alpes
- Department: Rhône
- Arrondissement: Villefranche-sur-Saône
- Canton: Le Bois-d'Oingt
- Commune: Val d'Oingt
- Area^{1}: 9.05 km^{2} (3.49 sq mi)
- Elevation: 440 m (1,440 ft)
- Highest elevation: 548 m (1,798 ft)
- Lowest elevation: 252 m (827 ft)
- Population (2022): 875
  - Density: 96.7/km^{2} (250/sq mi)
- Time zone: UTC+01:00 (CET)
  - Summer (DST): UTC+02:00 (CEST)
- Postal code: 69620
- ^{1} French Land Register data, which excludes lakes, ponds, glaciers > 1 km^{2} (0.386 sq mi or 247 acres) and river estuaries.

Saint-Laurent-d'Oingt (French pronunciation: [sɛ̃ loʁɑ̃ dwɛ̃], literally Saint-Laurent of Oingt) is a former commune in the Rhône department of the Auvergne-Rhône-Alpes region in eastern France. On 1 January 2017, Le Bois-d'Oingt, Oingt and Saint-Laurent-d'Oingt merged becoming one commune of Val d'Oingt.

== See also ==
- Communes of the Rhône department
