= Bully, Rhône =

Bully
- Commune
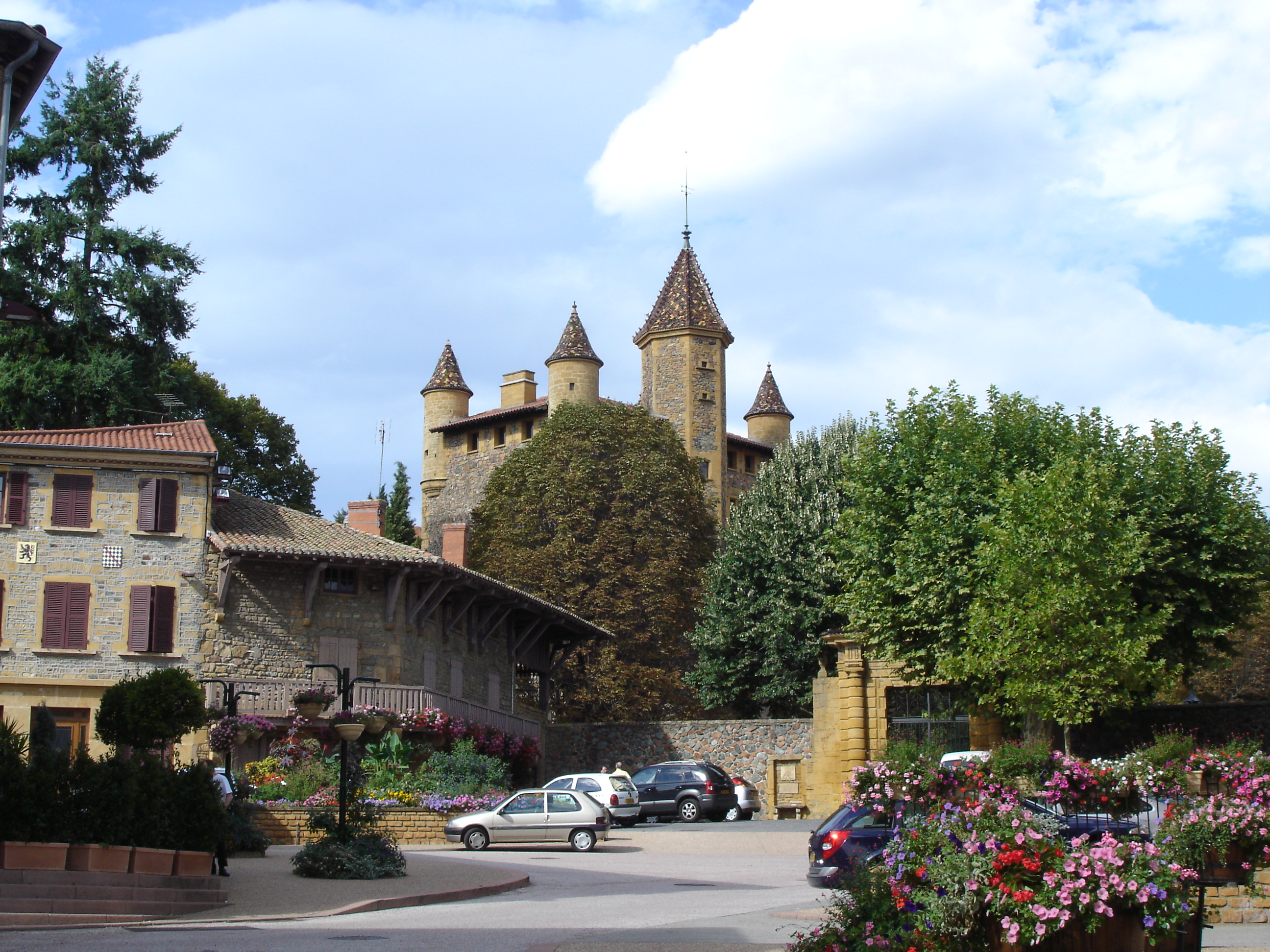
- The château, in Bully

- Coat of arms
- Location of Bully
- Location within France Location within Auvergne-Rhône-Alpes
- Coordinates: 45°51′07″N 4°35′02″E
- Country: France
- Region: Auvergne-Rhône-Alpes
- Department: Rhône
- Arrondissement: Villefranche-sur-Saône
- Canton: Val d'Oingt
- Intercommunality: Pays de l'Arbresle

Government
  - Mayor (2020–2026): Charles-Henri Bernard
- Area^{1}: 12.59 km^{2} (4.86 sq mi)
- Elevation: 313 m (1,027 ft)
- Highest elevation: 437 m (1,434 ft)
- Lowest elevation: 230 m (750 ft)
- Population (2023): 2,213
  - Density: 175.8/km^{2} (455.3/sq mi)
- Time zone: UTC+01:00 (CET)
  - Summer (DST): UTC+02:00 (CEST)
- INSEE/Postal code: 69032 /69210
- ^{1} French Land Register data, which excludes lakes, ponds, glaciers > 1 km^{2} (0.386 sq mi or 247 acres) and river estuaries.

Bully (French pronunciation: [byli]) is a commune in the Rhône department in eastern France.

== Population ==
Historical population
Year	Pop.	±% p.a.
1968	1,032	—
1975	1,095	+0.85%
1982	1,224	+1.60%
1990	1,464	+2.26%
1999	1,739	+1.93%
2007	2,003	+1.78%
2012	2,082	+0.78%
2017	1,982	−0.98%
2023	2,213	+1.85%
Source: INSEE

== See also ==
Communes of the Rhône department
