= Val d'Oingt =

- Commune
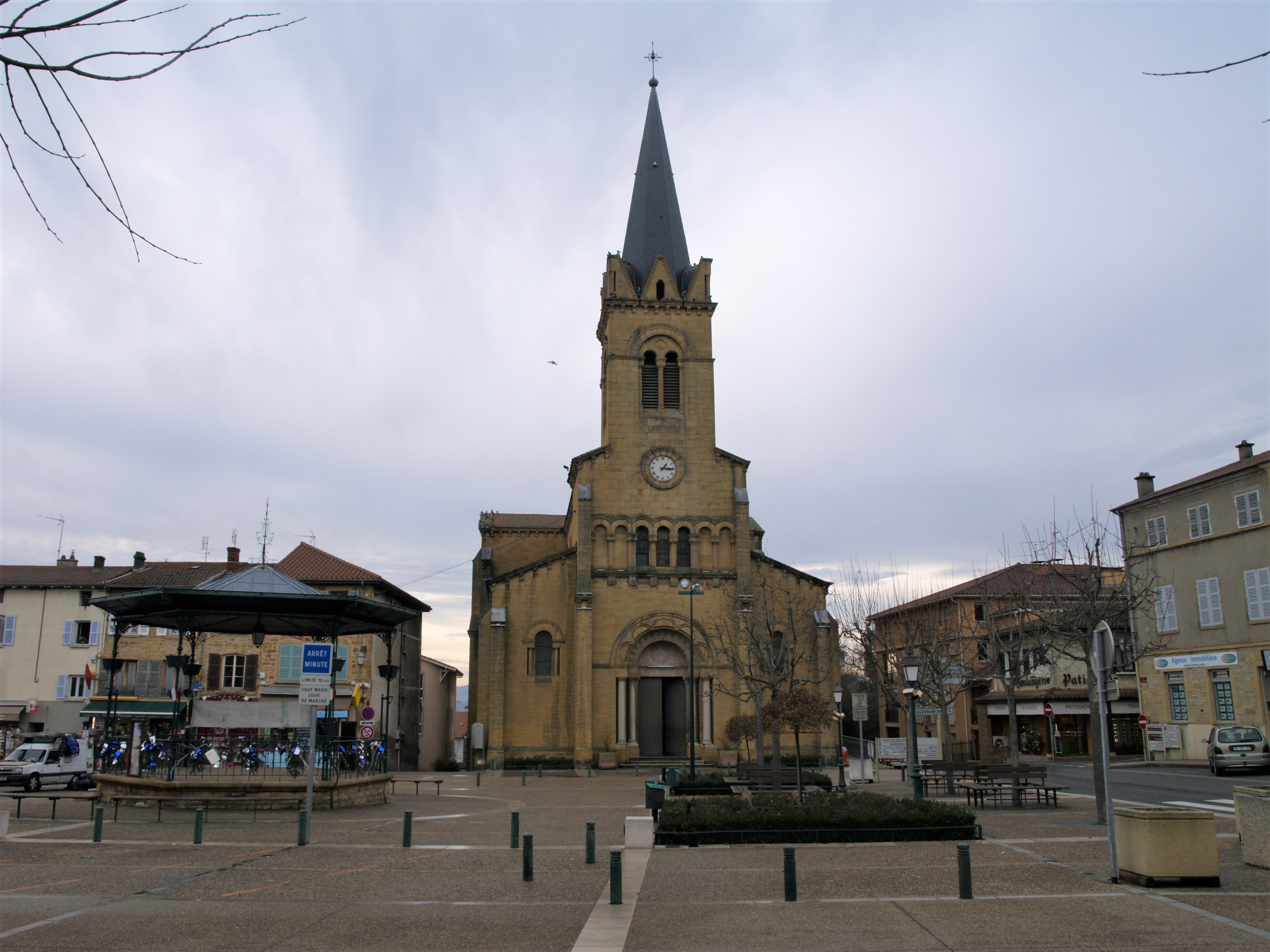
- Place de la Libération in Le Bois-d'Oingt
- Location of Val d'Oingt
- Location within France Location within Auvergne-Rhône-Alpes
- Coordinates: 45°55′16″N 4°35′10″E
- Country: France
- Region: Auvergne-Rhône-Alpes
- Department: Rhône
- Arrondissement: Villefranche-sur-Saône
- Canton: Val d'Oingt

Government
  - Mayor (2020–2026): Pascal Terrier
- Area^{1}: 18.1 km^{2} (7.0 sq mi)
- Highest elevation: 652 m (2,139 ft)
- Lowest elevation: 250 m (820 ft)
- Population (2023): 4,117
  - Density: 227/km^{2} (589/sq mi)
- Time zone: UTC+01:00 (CET)
  - Summer (DST): UTC+02:00 (CEST)
- INSEE/Postal code: 69024 /69620
- ^{1} French Land Register data, which excludes lakes, ponds, glaciers > 1 km^{2} (0.386 sq mi or 247 acres) and river estuaries.

Val d'Oingt (French pronunciation: [val dwɛ̃]; lit. 'Vale of Oingt') is a commune in the Rhône department in the Auvergne-Rhône-Alpes region in central-eastern France, established on 1 January 2017 by the merger of the former communes of Le Bois-d'Oingt, Oingt and Saint-Laurent-d'Oingt.

== Population ==
Population data refer to the area corresponding with the commune as of January 2025.

Historical population
Year	Pop.	±% p.a.
1968	1,780	—
1975	2,135	+2.63%
1982	2,368	+1.49%
1990	2,616	+1.25%
1999	3,072	+1.80%
2007	3,404	+1.29%
2012	3,751	+1.96%
2017	4,037	+1.48%
2023	4,117	+0.33%
Source: INSEE

== See also ==
- Communes of the Rhône department
