= Saint-Jean-des-Vignes =

- Commune
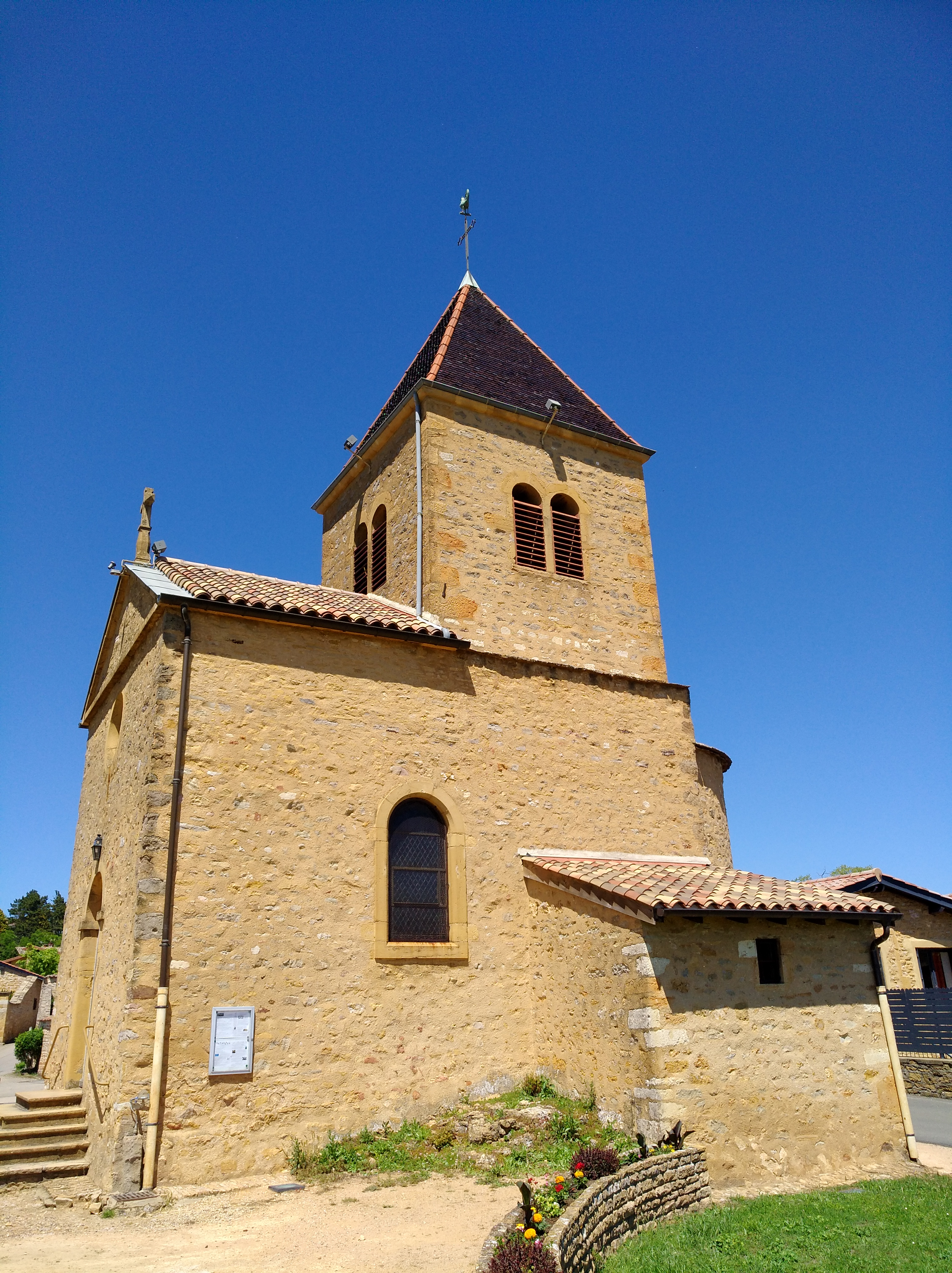
- The church in Saint-Jean-des-Vignes
- Location of Saint-Jean-des-Vignes
- Location within France Location within Auvergne-Rhône-Alpes
- Coordinates: 45°52′36″N 4°41′07″E
- Country: France
- Region: Auvergne-Rhône-Alpes
- Department: Rhône
- Arrondissement: Villefranche-sur-Saône
- Canton: Val d'Oingt

Government
  - Mayor (2020–2026): Philippe Bouteille
- Area^{1}: 2.57 km^{2} (0.99 sq mi)
- Elevation: 380 m (1,250 ft)
- Highest elevation: 396 m (1,299 ft)
- Lowest elevation: 234 m (768 ft)
- Population (2023): 486
  - Density: 189/km^{2} (490/sq mi)
- Time zone: UTC+01:00 (CET)
  - Summer (DST): UTC+02:00 (CEST)
- INSEE/Postal code: 69212 /69380
- ^{1} French Land Register data, which excludes lakes, ponds, glaciers > 1 km^{2} (0.386 sq mi or 247 acres) and river estuaries.

Saint-Jean-des-Vignes (French pronunciation: [sɛ̃ ʒɑ̃ de viɲ]) is a commune in the Rhône department in eastern France.

== See also ==
- Communes of the Rhône department
