= Saint-Vérand, Rhône =

Saint-Vérand
- Commune
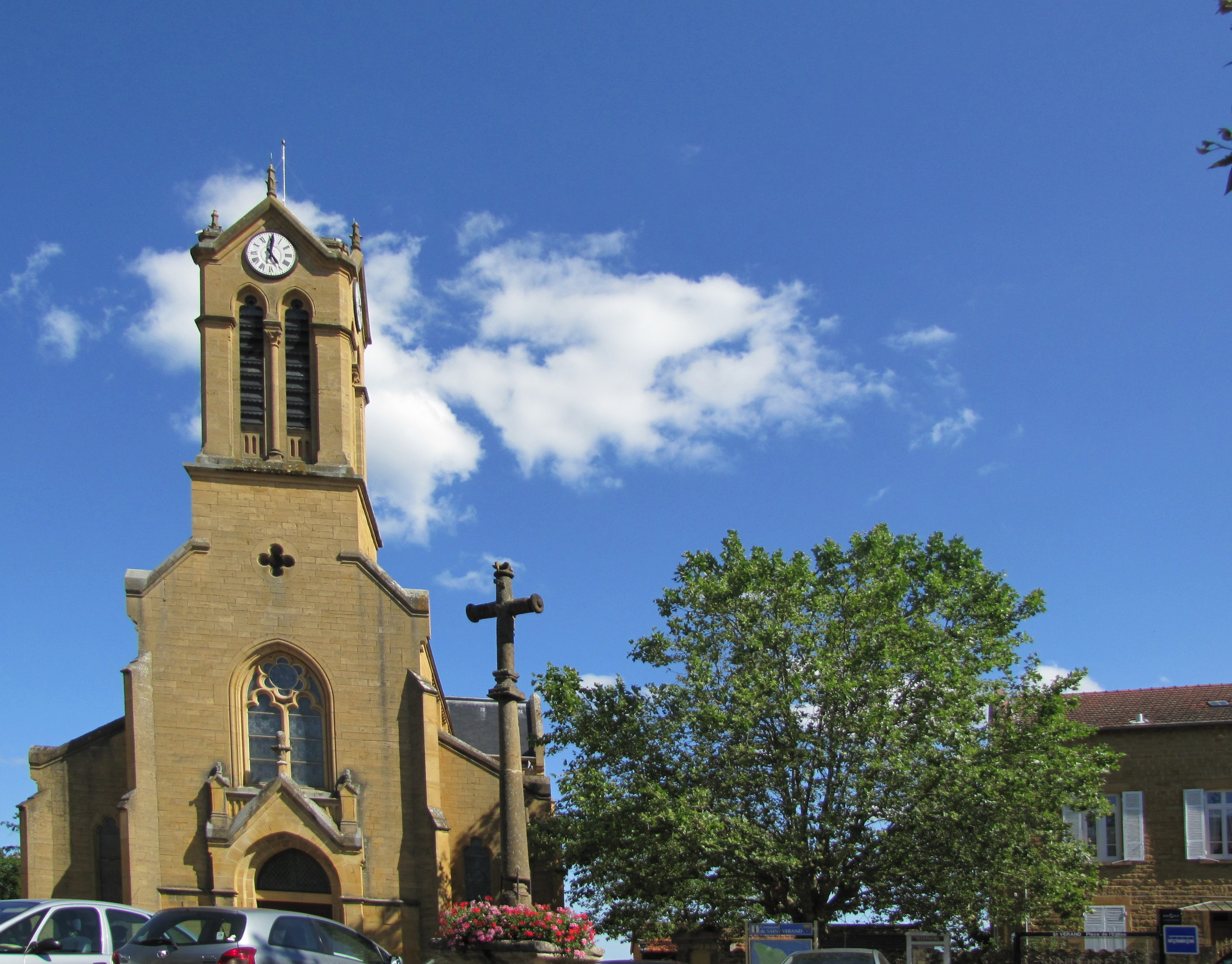
- The church in Saint-Vérand

- Coat of arms
- Location of Saint-Vérand
- Location within France Location within Auvergne-Rhône-Alpes
- Coordinates: 45°55′11″N 4°31′41″E
- Country: France
- Region: Auvergne-Rhône-Alpes
- Department: Rhône
- Arrondissement: Villefranche-sur-Saône
- Canton: Val d'Oingt

Government
  - Mayor (2020–2026): Gérard Chardon
- Area^{1}: 17.58 km^{2} (6.79 sq mi)
- Elevation: 385 m (1,263 ft)
- Highest elevation: 686 m (2,251 ft)
- Lowest elevation: 258 m (846 ft)
- Population (2023): 1,164
  - Density: 66.21/km^{2} (171.5/sq mi)
- Time zone: UTC+01:00 (CET)
  - Summer (DST): UTC+02:00 (CEST)
- INSEE/Postal code: 69239 /69620
- ^{1} French Land Register data, which excludes lakes, ponds, glaciers > 1 km^{2} (0.386 sq mi or 247 acres) and river estuaries.

Saint-Vérand (French pronunciation: [sɛ̃ veʁɑ̃]) is a commune in the Rhône department in eastern France.

== Population and housing of Saint-Vérand ==
The population of Saint-Vérand was 993 in 1999, 1082 in 2006, and 1192 in 2017. The population density of Saint-Vérand is 68 inhabitants per km². The number of housing of Saint-Vérand was 533 in 2007. These homes of Saint-Vérand consist of 432 main residences, 68 second or occasional homes and 33 vacant homes.

== See also ==
- Communes of the Rhône department
