= Alix, Rhône =

Alix
- Commune
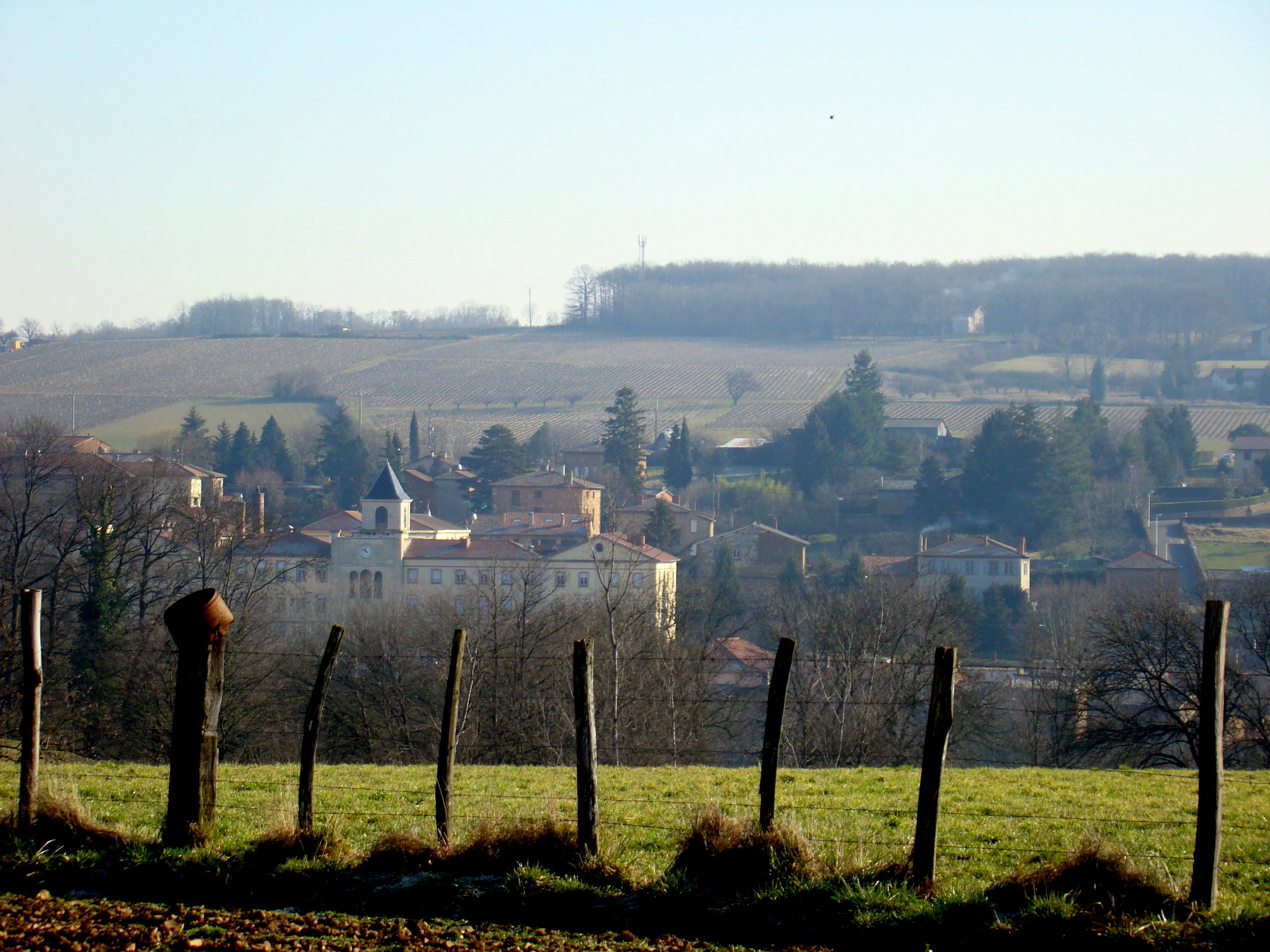
- A general view of Alix

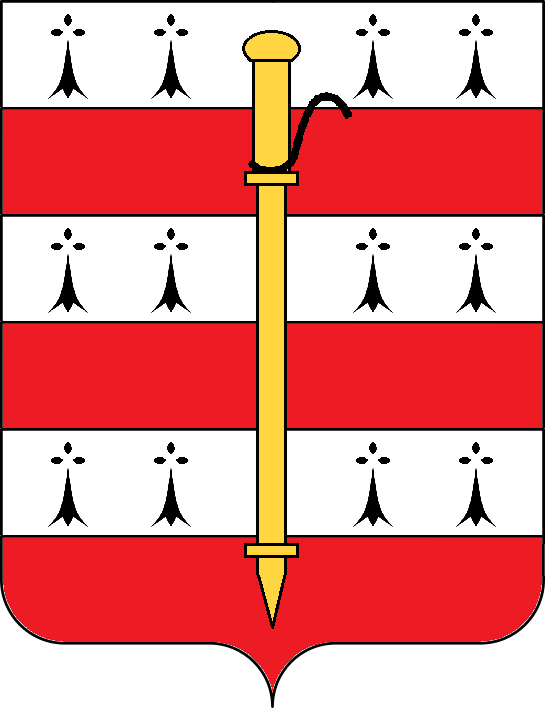
- Coat of arms
- Location of Alix
- Location within France Location within Auvergne-Rhône-Alpes
- Coordinates: 45°54′43″N 4°39′11″E
- Country: France
- Region: Auvergne-Rhône-Alpes
- Department: Rhône
- Arrondissement: Villefranche-sur-Saône
- Canton: Val d'Oingt
- Intercommunality: Beaujolais-Pierres-Dorées

Government
  - Mayor (2020–2026): Pascal Lebrun
- Area^{1}: 3.61 km^{2} (1.39 sq mi)
- Elevation: 284 m (932 ft)
- Highest elevation: 408 m (1,339 ft)
- Lowest elevation: 258 m (846 ft)
- Population (2023): 777
  - Density: 215/km^{2} (557/sq mi)
- Demonym: Alixois
- Time zone: UTC+01:00 (CET)
  - Summer (DST): UTC+02:00 (CEST)
- INSEE/Postal code: 69004 /69380
- Website: www.alix-village.fr
- ^{1} French Land Register data, which excludes lakes, ponds, glaciers > 1 km^{2} (0.386 sq mi or 247 acres) and river estuaries.

Alix is a commune in the Rhône department in eastern France.

== Population ==
Historical population
Year	Pop.	±% p.a.
1968	891	—
1975	842	−0.80%
1982	776	−1.16%
1990	665	−1.91%
1999	690	+0.41%
2007	679	−0.20%
2012	728	+1.40%
2017	763	+0.94%
2023	777	+0.30%
Source: INSEE

== See also ==
Communes of the Rhône department
