= Bagnols, Rhône =

Bagnols
- Commune
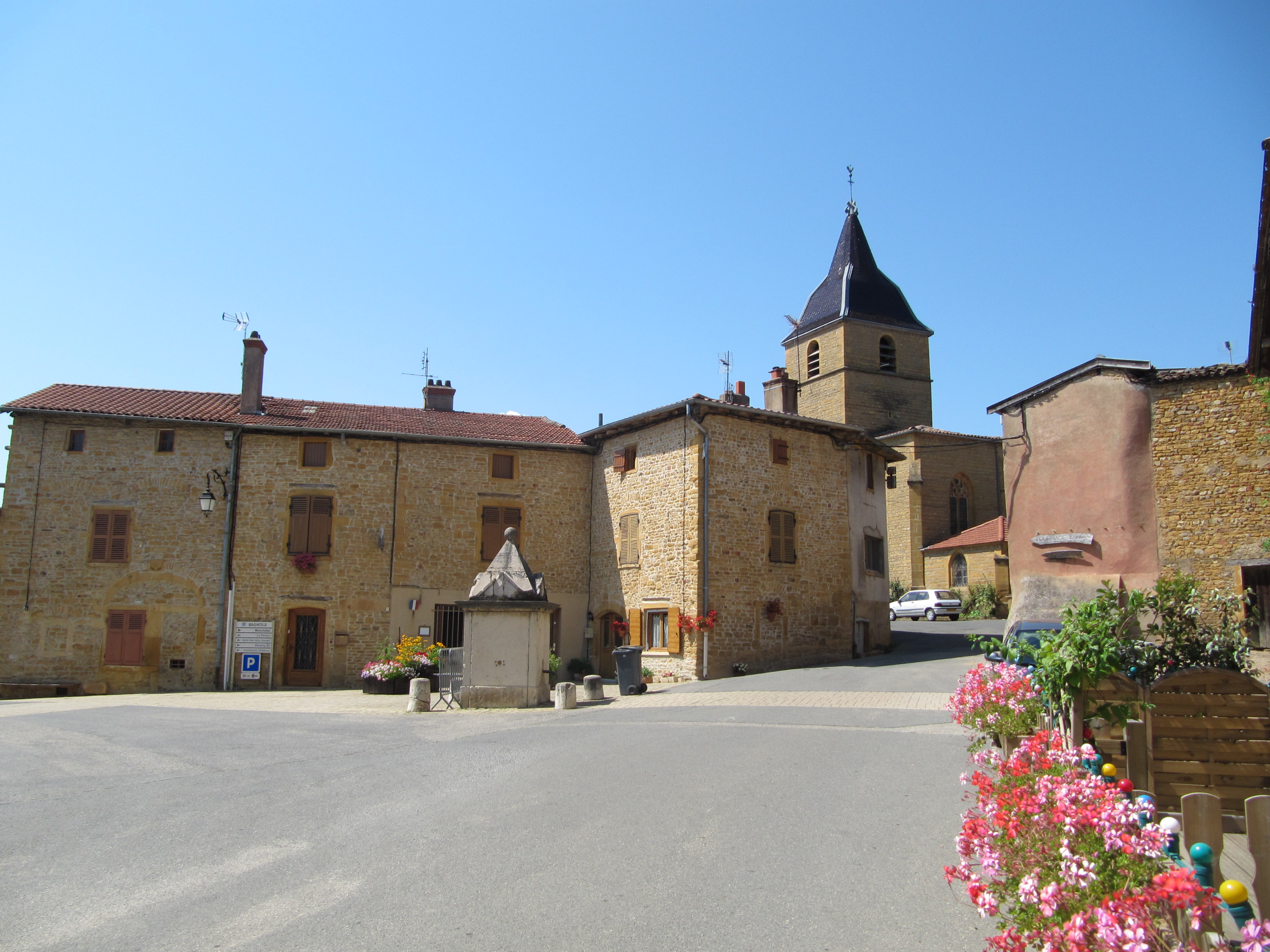
- The centre of Bagnols

- Coat of arms
- Location of Bagnols
- Location within France Location within Auvergne-Rhône-Alpes
- Coordinates: 45°55′06″N 4°36′29″E
- Country: France
- Region: Auvergne-Rhône-Alpes
- Department: Rhône
- Arrondissement: Villefranche-sur-Saône
- Canton: Val d'Oingt
- Intercommunality: Beaujolais Pierres Dorées

Government
  - Mayor (2020–2026): Jean-François Fady
- Area^{1}: 7.35 km^{2} (2.84 sq mi)
- Elevation: 430 m (1,410 ft)
- Highest elevation: 441 m (1,447 ft)
- Lowest elevation: 240 m (790 ft)
- Population (2023): 765
  - Density: 104/km^{2} (270/sq mi)
- Time zone: UTC+01:00 (CET)
  - Summer (DST): UTC+02:00 (CEST)
- INSEE/Postal code: 69017 /69620
- ^{1} French Land Register data, which excludes lakes, ponds, glaciers > 1 km^{2} (0.386 sq mi or 247 acres) and river estuaries.

Bagnols (French pronunciation: [baɲɔl]) is a commune of the Rhône department in eastern France.

== Demography ==
Historical population

Year	Pop.	±% p.a.
1793	534	—
1861	645	+0.28%
1911	527	−0.40%
1962	335	−0.88%
1968	369	+1.62%
1975	438	+2.48%
1982	603	+4.67%

Year	Pop.	±% p.a.
1990	636	+0.67%
1999	701	+1.09%
2007	735	+0.59%
2012	656	−2.25%
2017	731	+2.19%
2023	765	+0.76%

Source: EHESS and INSEE

== See also ==
Communes of the Rhône department
