= Le Breuil, Rhône =

Le Breuil
- Commune
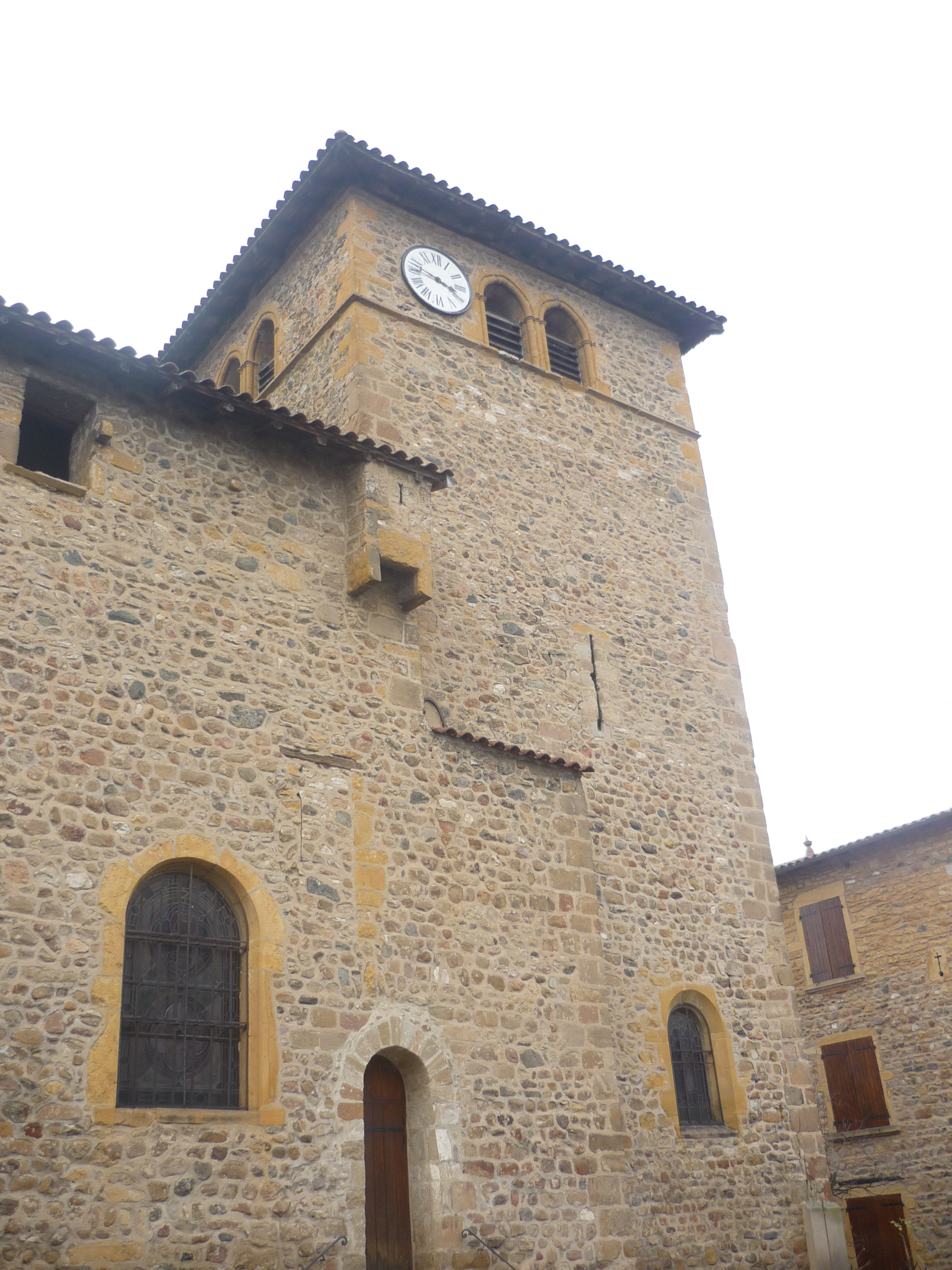
- The Church of Saint Pancrace

- Coat of arms
- Location of Le Breuil
- Location within France Location within Auvergne-Rhône-Alpes
- Coordinates: 45°53′42″N 4°35′18″E
- Country: France
- Region: Auvergne-Rhône-Alpes
- Department: Rhône
- Arrondissement: Villefranche-sur-Saône
- Canton: Val d'Oingt

Government
  - Mayor (2020–2026): Charles de Rambuteau
- Area^{1}: 5.63 km^{2} (2.17 sq mi)
- Elevation: 242 m (794 ft)
- Highest elevation: 391 m (1,283 ft)
- Lowest elevation: 225 m (738 ft)
- Population (2023): 533
  - Density: 94.7/km^{2} (245/sq mi)
- Time zone: UTC+01:00 (CET)
  - Summer (DST): UTC+02:00 (CEST)
- INSEE/Postal code: 69026 /69620
- ^{1} French Land Register data, which excludes lakes, ponds, glaciers > 1 km^{2} (0.386 sq mi or 247 acres) and river estuaries.

Le Breuil (French pronunciation: [lə bʁœj]) is a commune of the Rhône department in eastern France.

== See also ==
Communes of the Rhône department
