= Saint-Germain-Nuelles =

- Commune
- Location of Saint-Germain-Nuelles
- Location within France Location within Auvergne-Rhône-Alpes
- Coordinates: 45°51′11″N 4°36′43″E
- Country: France
- Region: Auvergne-Rhône-Alpes
- Department: Rhône
- Arrondissement: Villefranche-sur-Saône
- Canton: Val d'Oingt
- Intercommunality: Pays de L'Arbresle

Government
  - Mayor (2020–2026): Noël Ancian
- Area^{1}: 8.54 km^{2} (3.30 sq mi)
- Elevation: 315 m (1,033 ft)
- Highest elevation: 420 m (1,380 ft)
- Lowest elevation: 211 m (692 ft)
- Population (2023): 2,246
  - Density: 263/km^{2} (681/sq mi)
- Time zone: UTC+01:00 (CET)
  - Summer (DST): UTC+02:00 (CEST)
- INSEE/Postal code: 69208 /69210
- ^{1} French Land Register data, which excludes lakes, ponds, glaciers > 1 km^{2} (0.386 sq mi or 247 acres) and river estuaries.

Saint-Germain-Nuelles (French pronunciation: [sɛ̃ ʒɛʁmɛ̃ nɥɛl]) is a commune in the Rhône department in Auvergne-Rhône-Alpes region in eastern France. It is the result of the merger, on 1 January 2013, of the communes of Saint-Germain-sur-l'Arbresle and Nuelles.

== Population ==
Population data refer to the area corresponding with the commune as of January 2025.

Historical population
| Year | Pop. | ±% p.a. |
|---|---|---|
| 1968 | 877 | — |
| 1975 | 999 | +1.88% |
| 1982 | 1,158 | +2.13% |
| 1990 | 1,378 | +2.20% |
| 1999 | 1,626 | +1.86% |
| 2007 | 1,937 | +2.21% |
| 2012 | 2,068 | +1.32% |
| 2017 | 2,265 | +1.84% |
| 2023 | 2,246 | −0.14% |
Source: INSEE

== See also ==
- Communes of the Rhône department
