= Ternand =

- Commune
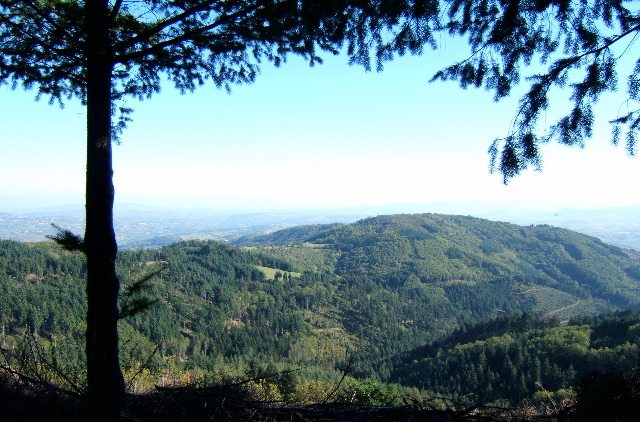
- Mont Chatard

- Coat of arms
- Location of Ternand
- Location within France Location within Auvergne-Rhône-Alpes
- Coordinates: 45°56′43″N 4°31′45″E
- Country: France
- Region: Auvergne-Rhône-Alpes
- Department: Rhône
- Arrondissement: Villefranche-sur-Saône
- Canton: Val d'Oingt
- Intercommunality: Beaujolais-Pierres Dorées

Government
  - Mayor (2020–2026): Bernard Dumas
- Area^{1}: 10.75 km^{2} (4.15 sq mi)
- Elevation: 273 m (896 ft)
- Highest elevation: 741 m (2,431 ft)
- Lowest elevation: 269 m (883 ft)
- Population (2023): 762
  - Density: 70.9/km^{2} (184/sq mi)
- Time zone: UTC+01:00 (CET)
  - Summer (DST): UTC+02:00 (CEST)
- INSEE/Postal code: 69245 /69620
- ^{1} French Land Register data, which excludes lakes, ponds, glaciers > 1 km^{2} (0.386 sq mi or 247 acres) and river estuaries.

Ternand (French pronunciation: [tɛʁnɑ̃]) is a commune in the Rhône department in eastern France.

== See also ==
- Communes of the Rhône department
