= Sainte-Paule =

- Commune
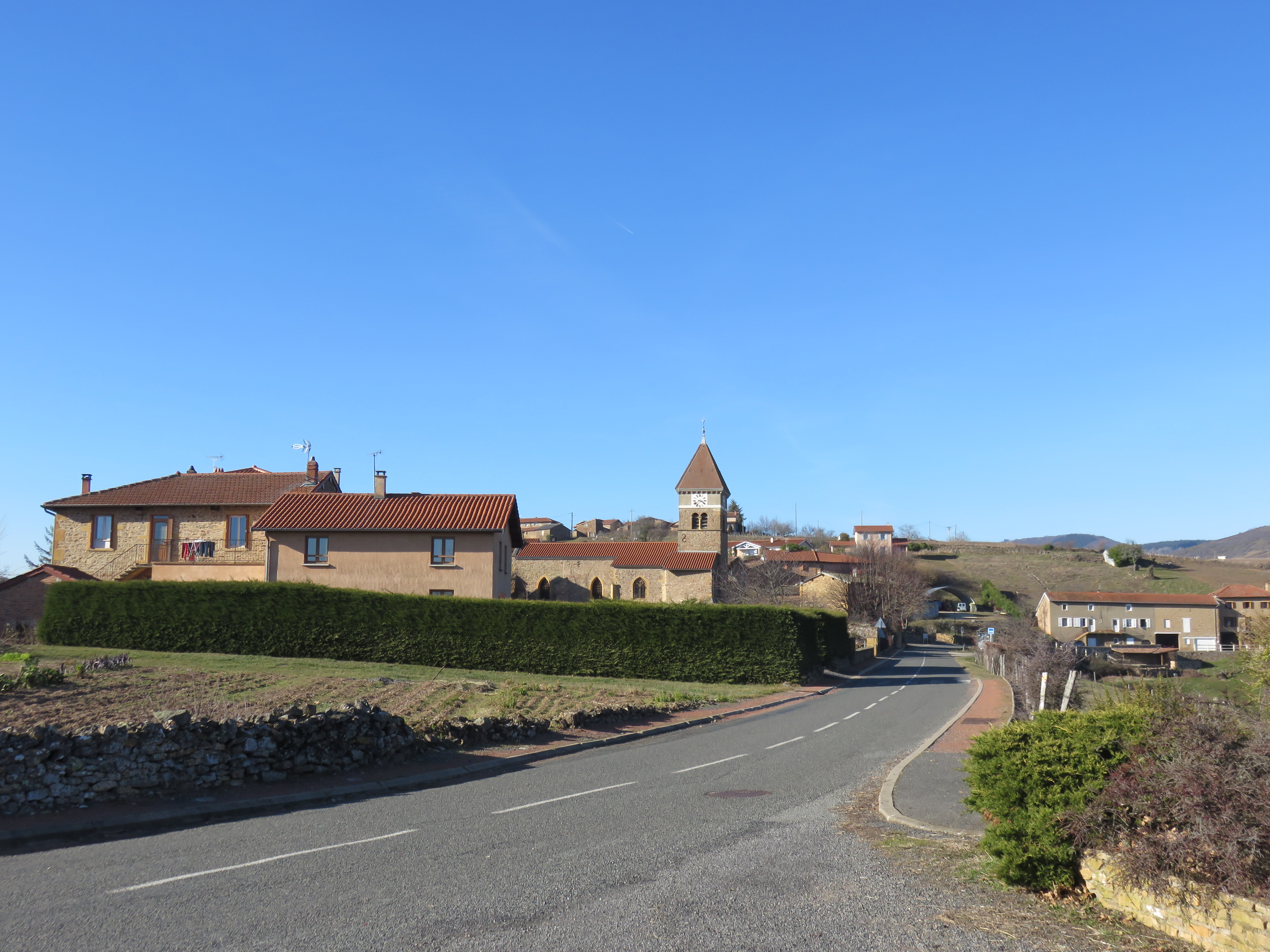
- A view of Sainte-Paule.

- Coat of arms
- Location of Sainte-Paule
- Location within France Location within Auvergne-Rhône-Alpes
- Coordinates: 45°57′43″N 4°33′57″E
- Country: France
- Region: Auvergne-Rhône-Alpes
- Department: Rhône
- Arrondissement: Villefranche-sur-Saône
- Canton: Val d'Oingt

Government
  - Mayor (2020–2026): Olivier Leccia
- Area^{1}: 7.5 km^{2} (2.9 sq mi)
- Elevation: 510 m (1,670 ft)
- Highest elevation: 773 m (2,536 ft)
- Lowest elevation: 299 m (981 ft)
- Population (2023): 338
  - Density: 45/km^{2} (120/sq mi)
- Time zone: UTC+01:00 (CET)
  - Summer (DST): UTC+02:00 (CEST)
- INSEE/Postal code: 69230 /69620
- ^{1} French Land Register data, which excludes lakes, ponds, glaciers > 1 km^{2} (0.386 sq mi or 247 acres) and river estuaries.

Sainte-Paule (French pronunciation: [sɛ̃t pol]) is a commune in the Rhône department in eastern France.

== See also ==
- Communes of the Rhône department
