= Frontenas =

- Commune
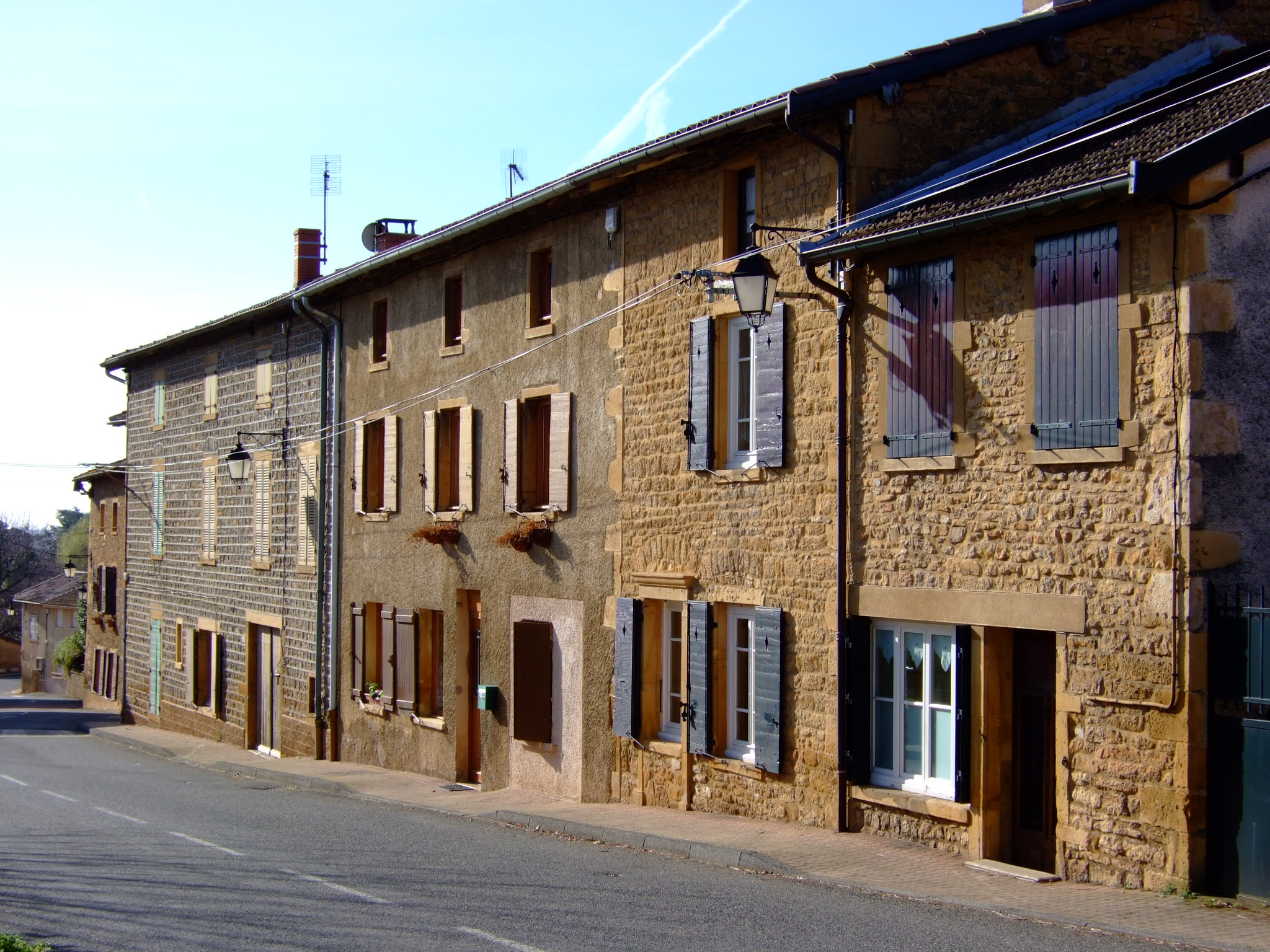
- A road in Frontenas
- Location of Frontenas
- Location within France Location within Auvergne-Rhône-Alpes
- Coordinates: 45°55′35″N 4°37′08″E
- Country: France
- Region: Auvergne-Rhône-Alpes
- Department: Rhône
- Arrondissement: Villefranche-sur-Saône
- Canton: Val d'Oingt

Government
  - Mayor (2020–2026): Thomas Duperrier
- Area^{1}: 3.42 km^{2} (1.32 sq mi)
- Elevation: 379 m (1,243 ft)
- Highest elevation: 430 m (1,410 ft)
- Lowest elevation: 260 m (850 ft)
- Population (2023): 915
  - Density: 268/km^{2} (693/sq mi)
- Time zone: UTC+01:00 (CET)
  - Summer (DST): UTC+02:00 (CEST)
- INSEE/Postal code: 69090 /69620
- ^{1} French Land Register data, which excludes lakes, ponds, glaciers > 1 km^{2} (0.386 sq mi or 247 acres) and river estuaries.

Frontenas is a commune in the Rhône department in eastern France.

== See also ==
- Communes of the Rhône department
