= Chamelet =

- Commune
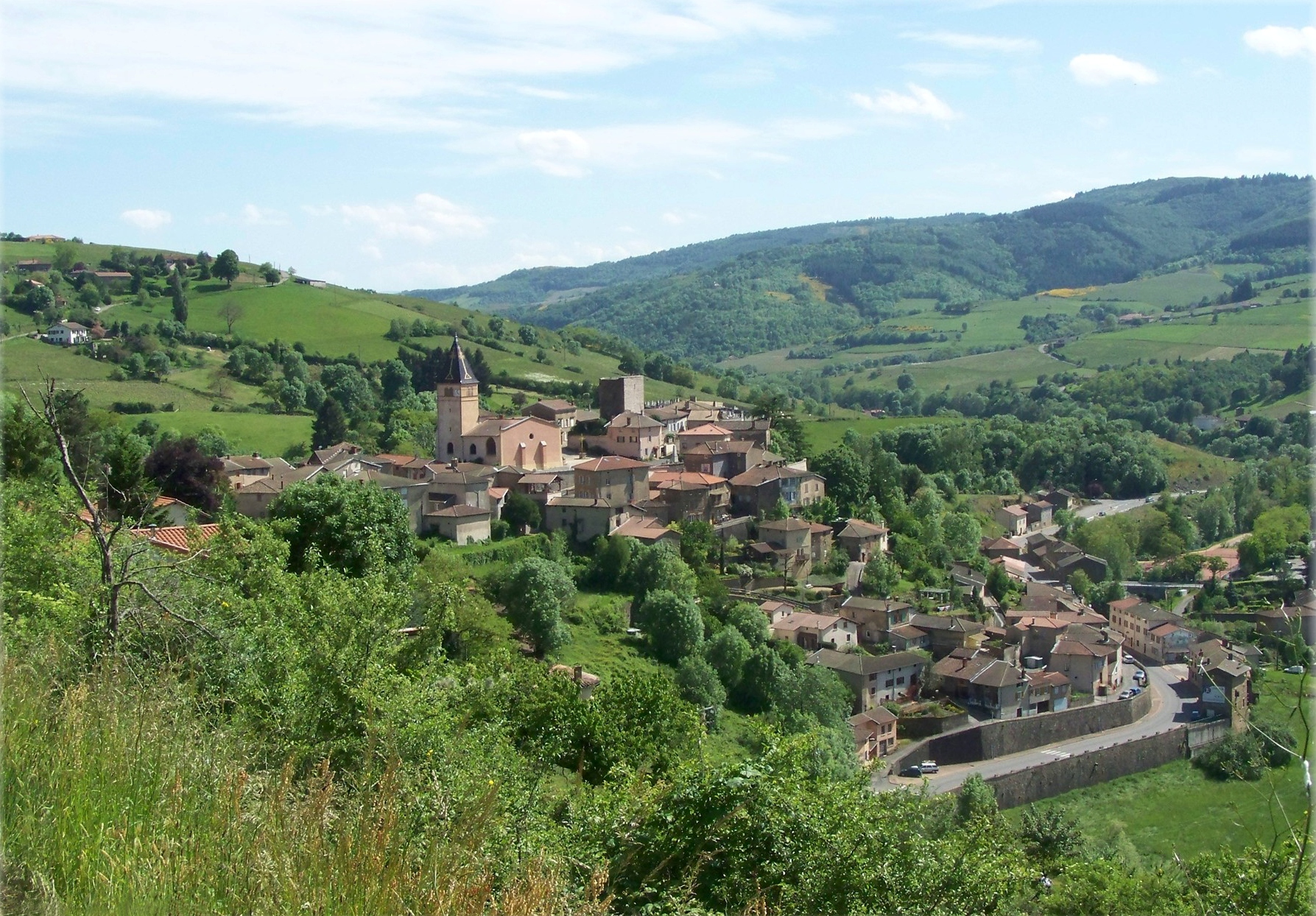
- A general view of Chamelet
- Location of Chamelet
- Location within France Location within Auvergne-Rhône-Alpes
- Coordinates: 45°59′05″N 4°30′38″E
- Country: France
- Region: Auvergne-Rhône-Alpes
- Department: Rhône
- Arrondissement: Villefranche-sur-Saône
- Canton: Val d'Oingt
- Intercommunality: Beaujolais-Pierres Dorées

Government
  - Mayor (2020–2026): Alain Chambru
- Area^{1}: 14.43 km^{2} (5.57 sq mi)
- Elevation: 309 m (1,014 ft)
- Highest elevation: 742 m (2,434 ft)
- Lowest elevation: 291 m (955 ft)
- Population (2023): 706
  - Density: 48.9/km^{2} (127/sq mi)
- Time zone: UTC+01:00 (CET)
  - Summer (DST): UTC+02:00 (CEST)
- INSEE/Postal code: 69039 /69620
- ^{1} French Land Register data, which excludes lakes, ponds, glaciers > 1 km^{2} (0.386 sq mi or 247 acres) and river estuaries.

Chamelet (French pronunciation: [ʃamlɛ]) is a commune in the Rhône department in eastern France.

== See also ==
Communes of the Rhône department
