= Moiré, Rhône =

Moiré
- Commune
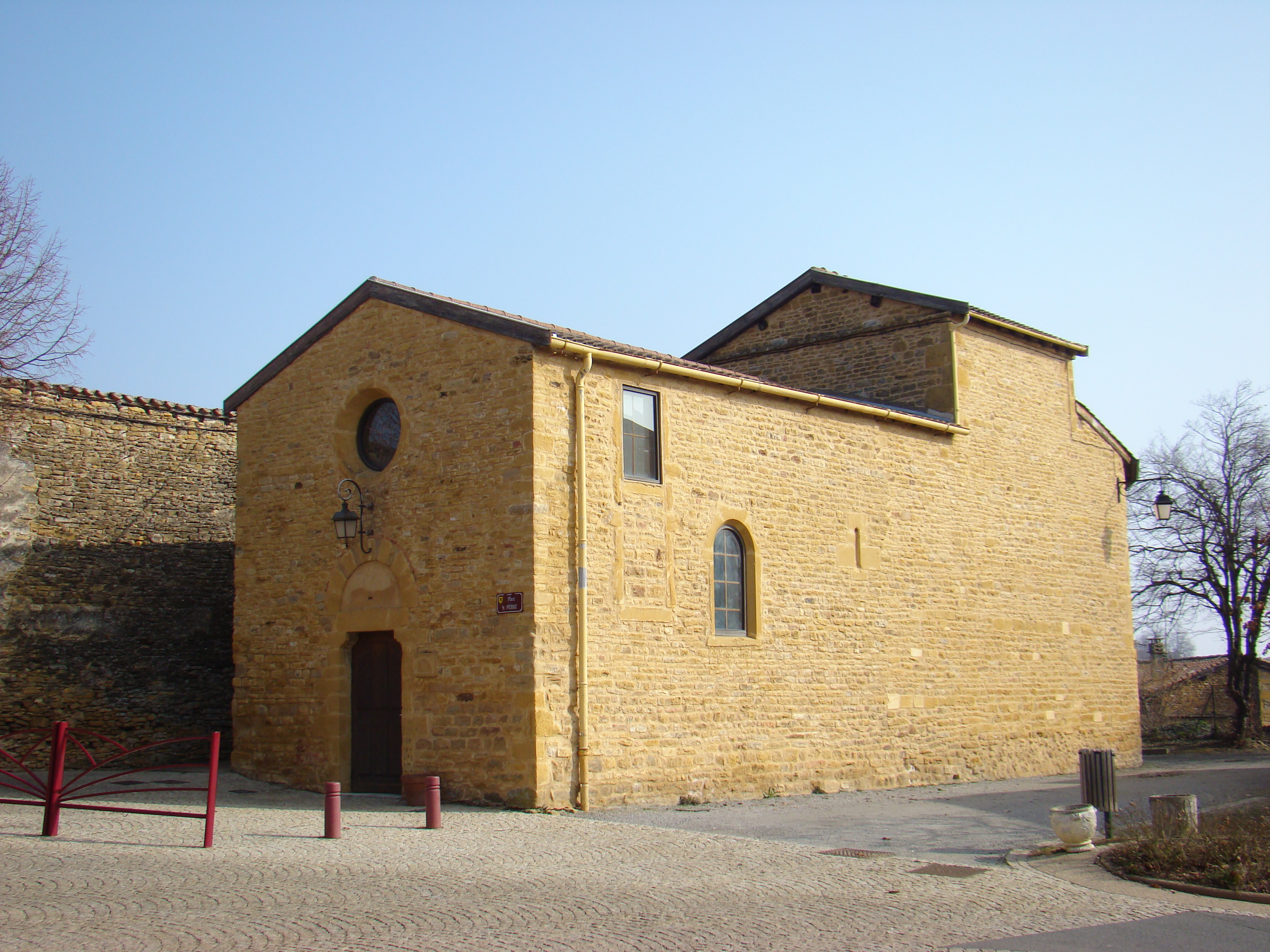
- The chapel of Saint-Pierre, in Moiré
- Location of Moiré
- Location within France Location within Auvergne-Rhône-Alpes
- Coordinates: 45°55′42″N 4°36′15″E
- Country: France
- Region: Auvergne-Rhône-Alpes
- Department: Rhône
- Arrondissement: Villefranche-sur-Saône
- Canton: Val d'Oingt

Government
  - Mayor (2020–2026): Annie Commandeur
- Area^{1}: 2.03 km^{2} (0.78 sq mi)
- Elevation: 45 m (148 ft)
- Highest elevation: 521 m (1,709 ft)
- Lowest elevation: 297 m (974 ft)
- Population (2023): 240
  - Density: 120/km^{2} (310/sq mi)
- Time zone: UTC+01:00 (CET)
  - Summer (DST): UTC+02:00 (CEST)
- INSEE/Postal code: 69134 /69620
- ^{1} French Land Register data, which excludes lakes, ponds, glaciers > 1 km^{2} (0.386 sq mi or 247 acres) and river estuaries.

Moiré (French pronunciation: [mwaʁe]) is a commune in the Rhône department in eastern France. It is around 10 km south west of Villefranche-sur-Saône, and around 25 km north west of Lyon.

== See also ==
- Communes of the Rhône department
