= Létra =

- Commune
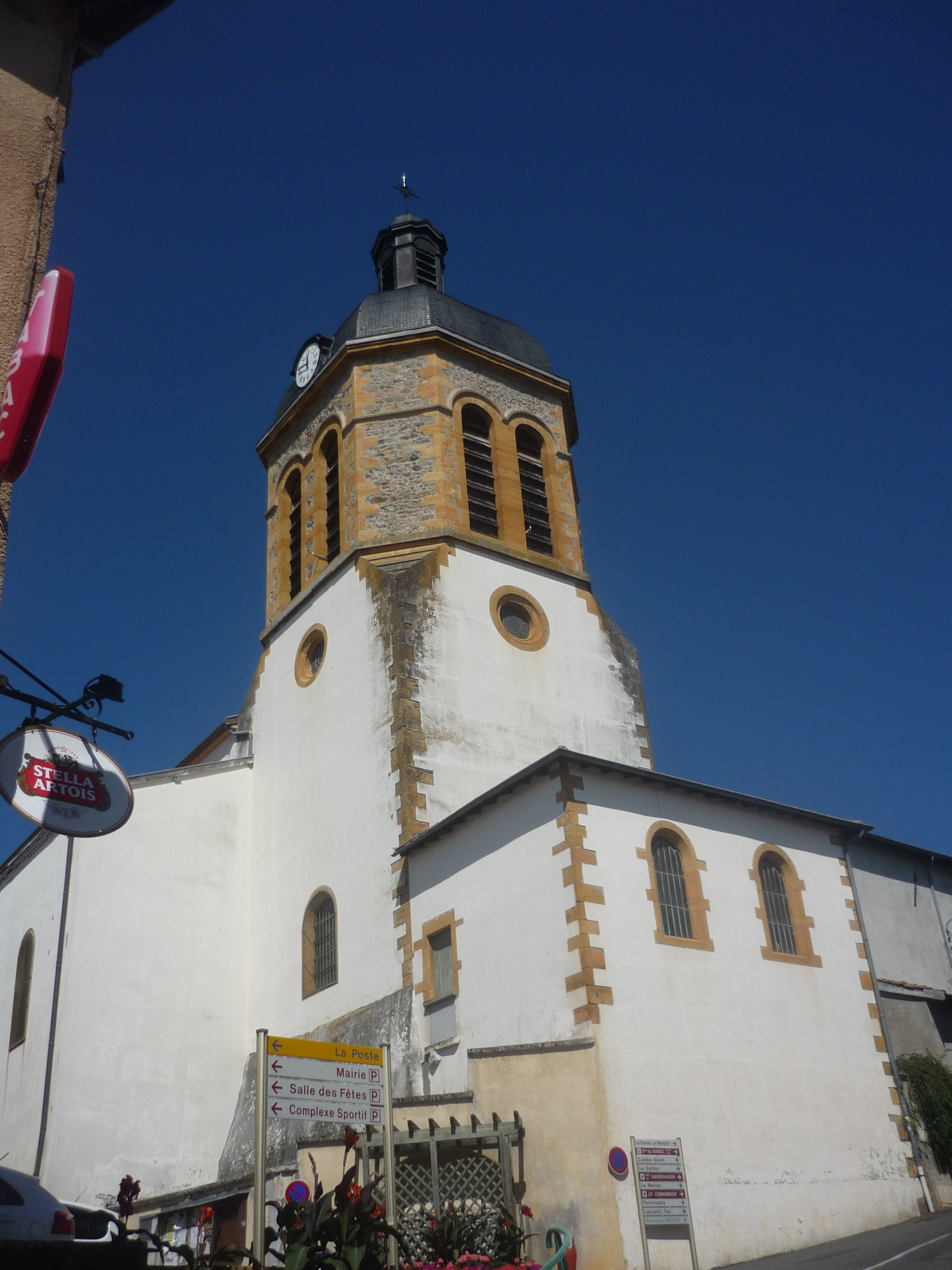
- The church in Létra
- Location of Létra
- Location within France Location within Auvergne-Rhône-Alpes
- Coordinates: 45°57′47″N 4°31′30″E
- Country: France
- Region: Auvergne-Rhône-Alpes
- Department: Rhône
- Arrondissement: Villefranche-sur-Saône
- Canton: Val d'Oingt
- Intercommunality: Beaujolais Pierres Dorées

Government
  - Mayor (2020–2026): Didier Chavand
- Area^{1}: 14.64 km^{2} (5.65 sq mi)
- Elevation: 350 m (1,150 ft)
- Highest elevation: 727 m (2,385 ft)
- Lowest elevation: 275 m (902 ft)
- Population (2023): 901
  - Density: 61.5/km^{2} (159/sq mi)
- Time zone: UTC+01:00 (CET)
  - Summer (DST): UTC+02:00 (CEST)
- INSEE/Postal code: 69113 /69620
- ^{1} French Land Register data, which excludes lakes, ponds, glaciers > 1 km^{2} (0.386 sq mi or 247 acres) and river estuaries.

Létra (French pronunciation: [letʁa]) is a commune in the Rhône department in eastern France.

== See also ==
- Communes of the Rhône department
