= Cogny, Rhône =

Cogny
- Commune
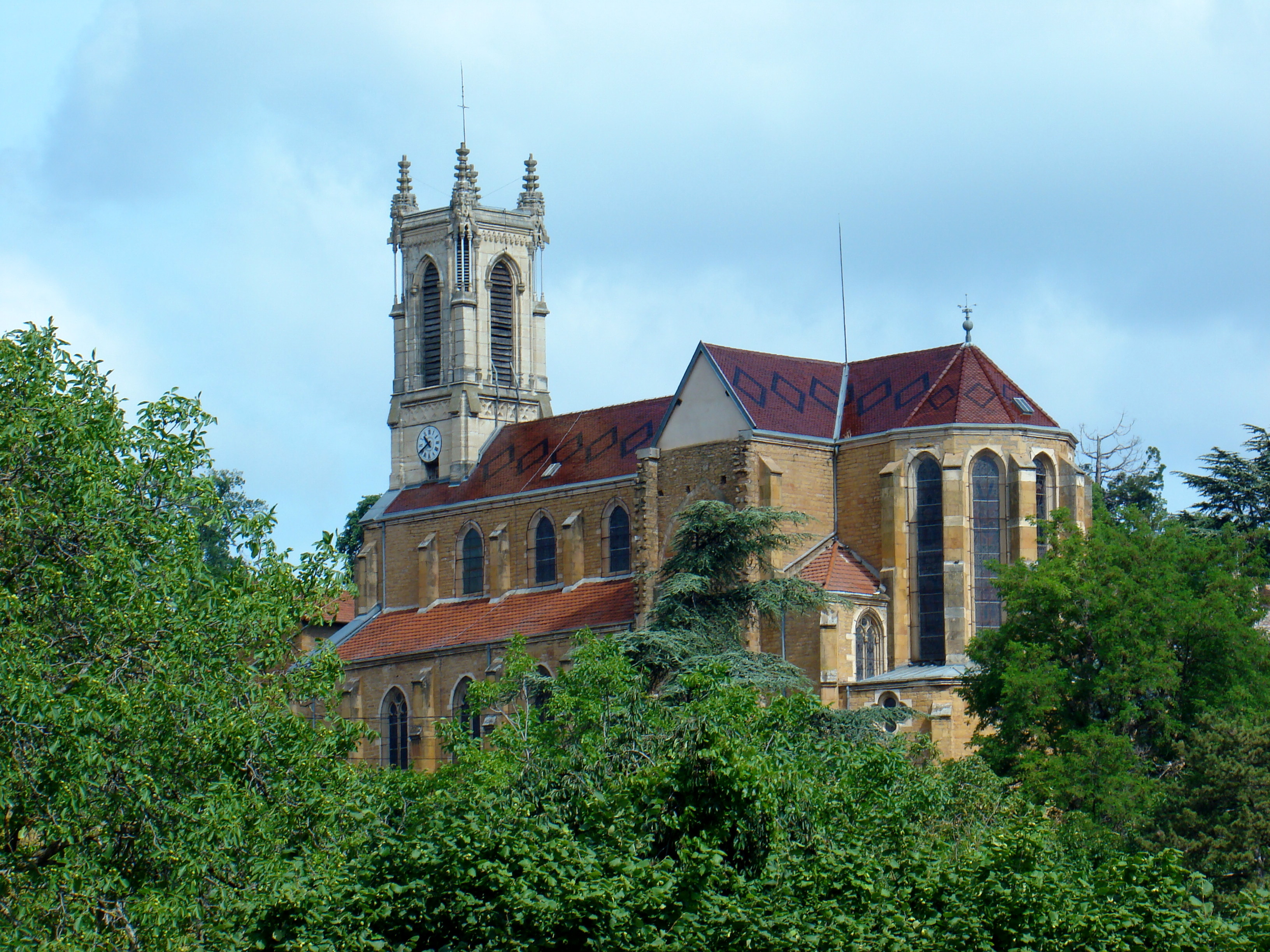
- The church of Cogny
- Location of Cogny
- Location within France Location within Auvergne-Rhône-Alpes
- Coordinates: 45°59′18″N 4°37′32″E
- Country: France
- Region: Auvergne-Rhône-Alpes
- Department: Rhône
- Arrondissement: Villefranche-sur-Saône
- Canton: Val d'Oingt
- Intercommunality: CA Villefranche Beaujolais Saône

Government
  - Mayor (2020–2026): Rémi Aurion
- Area^{1}: 5.83 km^{2} (2.25 sq mi)
- Elevation: 440 m (1,440 ft)
- Highest elevation: 780 m (2,560 ft)
- Lowest elevation: 257 m (843 ft)
- Population (2023): 1,211
  - Density: 208/km^{2} (538/sq mi)
- Time zone: UTC+01:00 (CET)
  - Summer (DST): UTC+02:00 (CEST)
- INSEE/Postal code: 69061 /69640
- ^{1} French Land Register data, which excludes lakes, ponds, glaciers > 1 km^{2} (0.386 sq mi or 247 acres) and river estuaries.

Cogny (French pronunciation: [kɔɲi]) is a commune in the Rhône department in eastern France.

== See also ==
- Communes of the Rhône department
