= Prony brake =

Device to measure torque of an engine

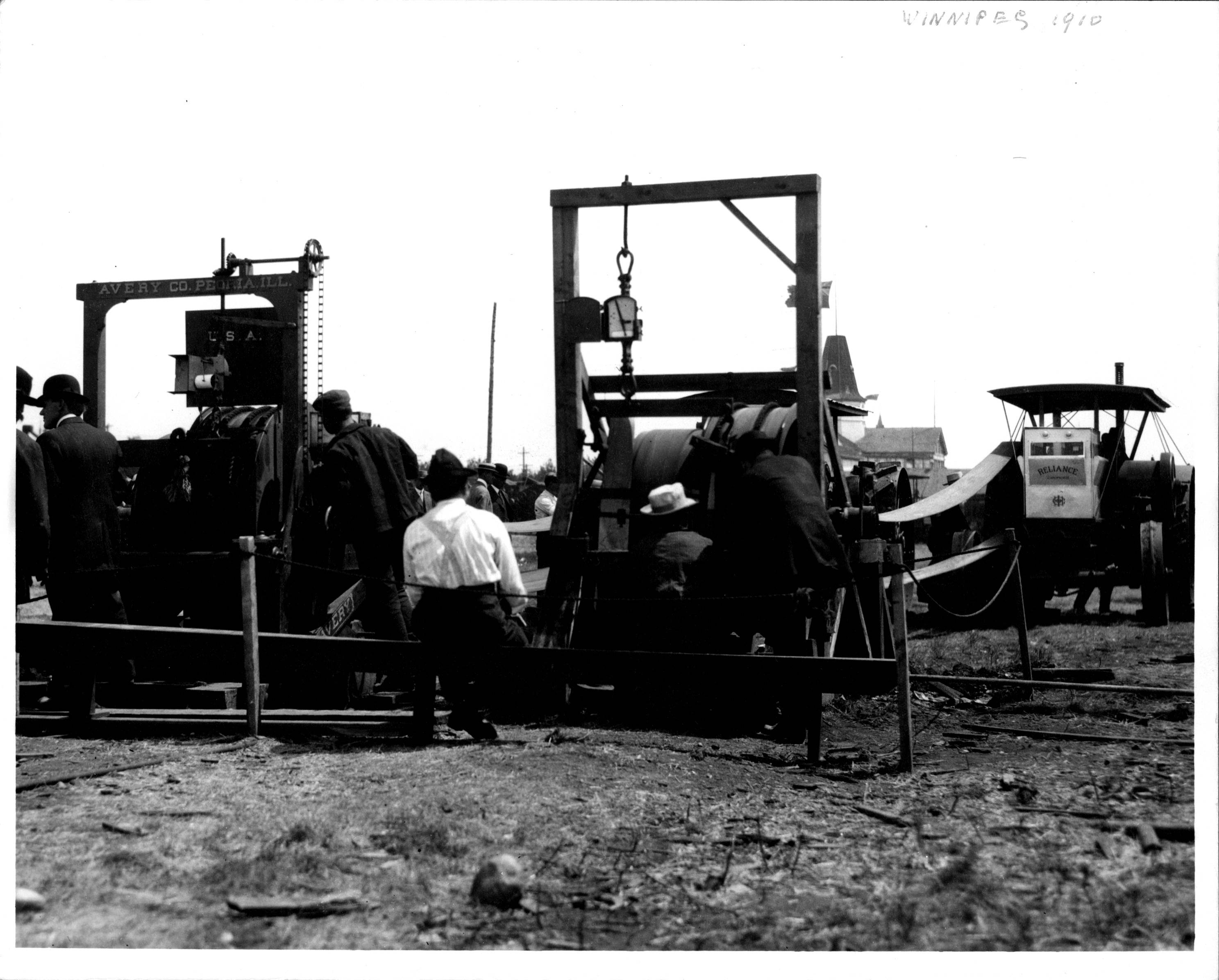
Prony brake dynamometers at a tractor contest in 1910

Schematic of a Prony brake

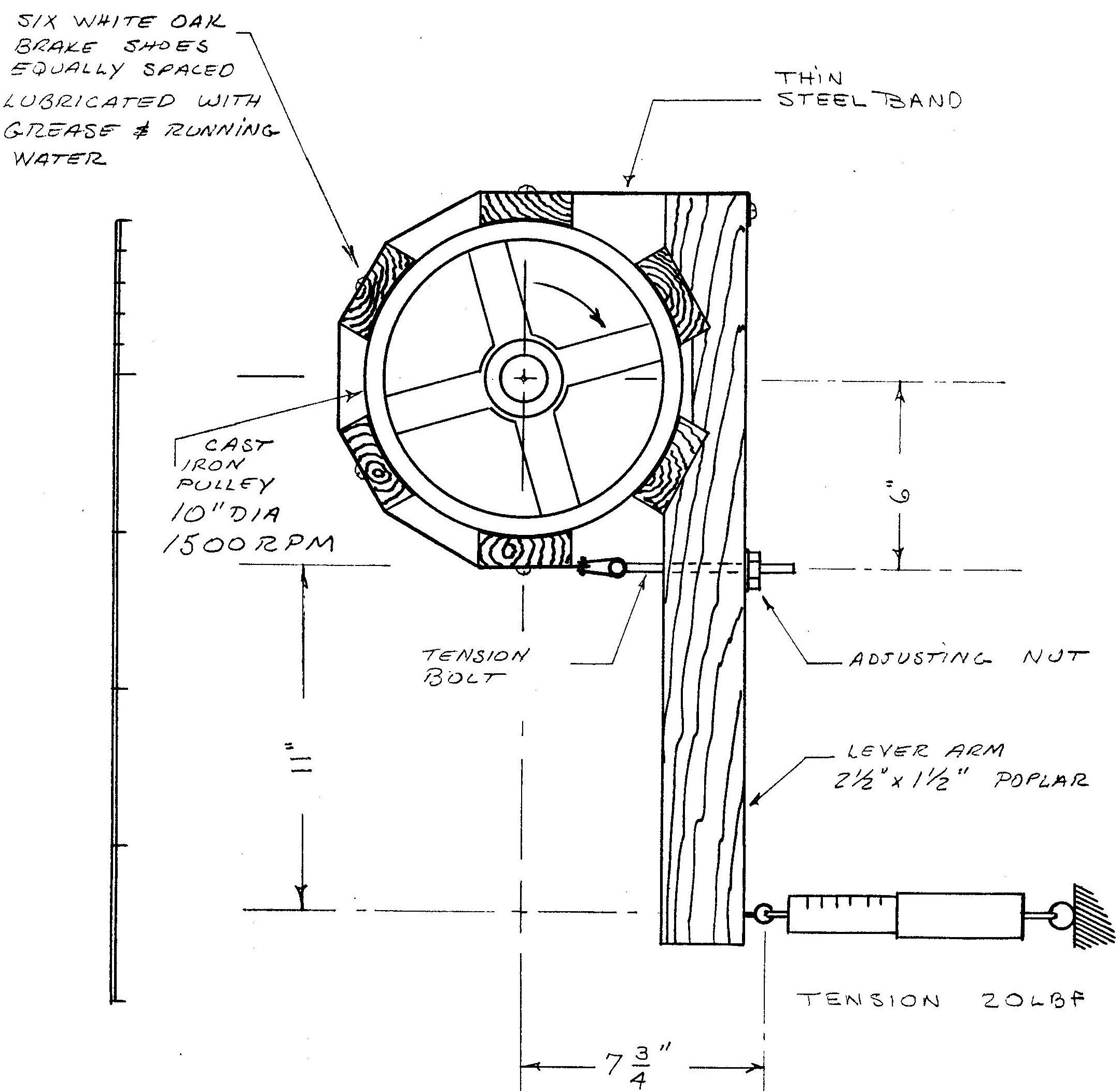
Actual Prony Brake built for testing 5HP Steam Engine

The Prony brake is a device invented by Gaspard de Prony in 1821 to measure the torque produced by an engine. The term "brake horsepower" is one measurement of power derived from this method of measuring torque. (Power is calculated by multiplying torque by rotational speed.)

Essentially the measurement is made by wrapping a cord or belt around the output shaft of the engine and measuring the force transferred to the belt through friction. The friction is increased by tightening the belt until the frequency of rotation of the shaft is reduced to a desired rotational speed. In practice more engine power can then be applied until the limit of the engine is reached.

In its simplest form an engine is connected to a rotating drum by means of an output shaft. A friction band is wrapped around half the drum's circumference and each end attached to a separate spring balance. A substantial pre-load is then applied to the ends of the band, so that each spring balance has an initial and identical reading. When the engine is running, the frictional force between the drum and the band will increase the force reading on one balance and decrease it on the other. The difference between the two readings multiplied by the radius of the driven drum is equal to the torque. If the engine speed is measured with a tachometer, the brake horsepower is easily calculated.

An alternate mechanism is to clamp a lever to the shaft and measure using a single balance. The torque is then related to the lever length, shaft diameter and measured force.

The device is generally used over a range of engine speeds to obtain power and torque curves for the engine, since there is a non-linear relationship between torque and engine speed for most engine types.

Power output in SI units may be calculated as follows:

Rotary power (in newton-meters per second, N·m/s) = 2π × the distance from the center-line of the drum (the friction device) to the point of measurement (in meters, m) × rotational speed (in revolutions per second) × measured force (in newtons, N).

Or in Imperial units:

Rotary power (in pound-feet per second, lbf·ft/s) = 2π × distance from center-line of the drum (the friction device) to the point of measurement (in feet, ft) × rotational speed (in revolutions per second) × measured force (in pounds, lbf).
