= Canton of Val d'Oingt =

Coordinates: 45.9336°N 4.5842°E

Val d'Oingt
- Canton
- Country: France
- Region: Auvergne-Rhône-Alpes
- Department: Rhône
- No. of communes: {{{nbcomm}}}
- Area: 197.7 km^{2} (76.3 sq mi)
- Population (2023): 30,400
  - Density: 154/km^{2} (398/sq mi)
- INSEE code: 6904

The Canton of Val d'Oingt (before March 2020: canton of Le Bois-d'Oingt) is a French administrative division, located in the Rhône department.

The canton was established in 1790 and modified by decree of 27 February 2014 which came into force in March 2015. The canton was expanded from 18 to 27 communes (5 of which were merged into the new communes Porte des Pierres Dorées and Val d'Oingt).

== Composition ==
The canton of Val d'Oingt is composed of 23 communes:

Communes	Population (2012)
Alix	728
Bagnols	656
Belmont-d'Azergues	628
Le Breuil	452
Bully	2,082
Chamelet	649
Charnay	1,072
Châtillon	2,192
Chessy	1,824
Cogny	1,154
Frontenas	812
Légny	650
Létra	947
Moiré	199
Porte des Pierres Dorées	3,482
Sainte-Paule	337
Saint-Germain-Nuelles	2,068
Saint-Jean-des-Vignes	400
Saint-Vérand	1,111
Ternand	715
Theizé	1,088
Val d'Oingt	3,751
Ville-sur-Jarnioux	807

== See also ==
- Cantons of the Rhône department
- Communes of the Rhône department
