= Theizé =

- Commune
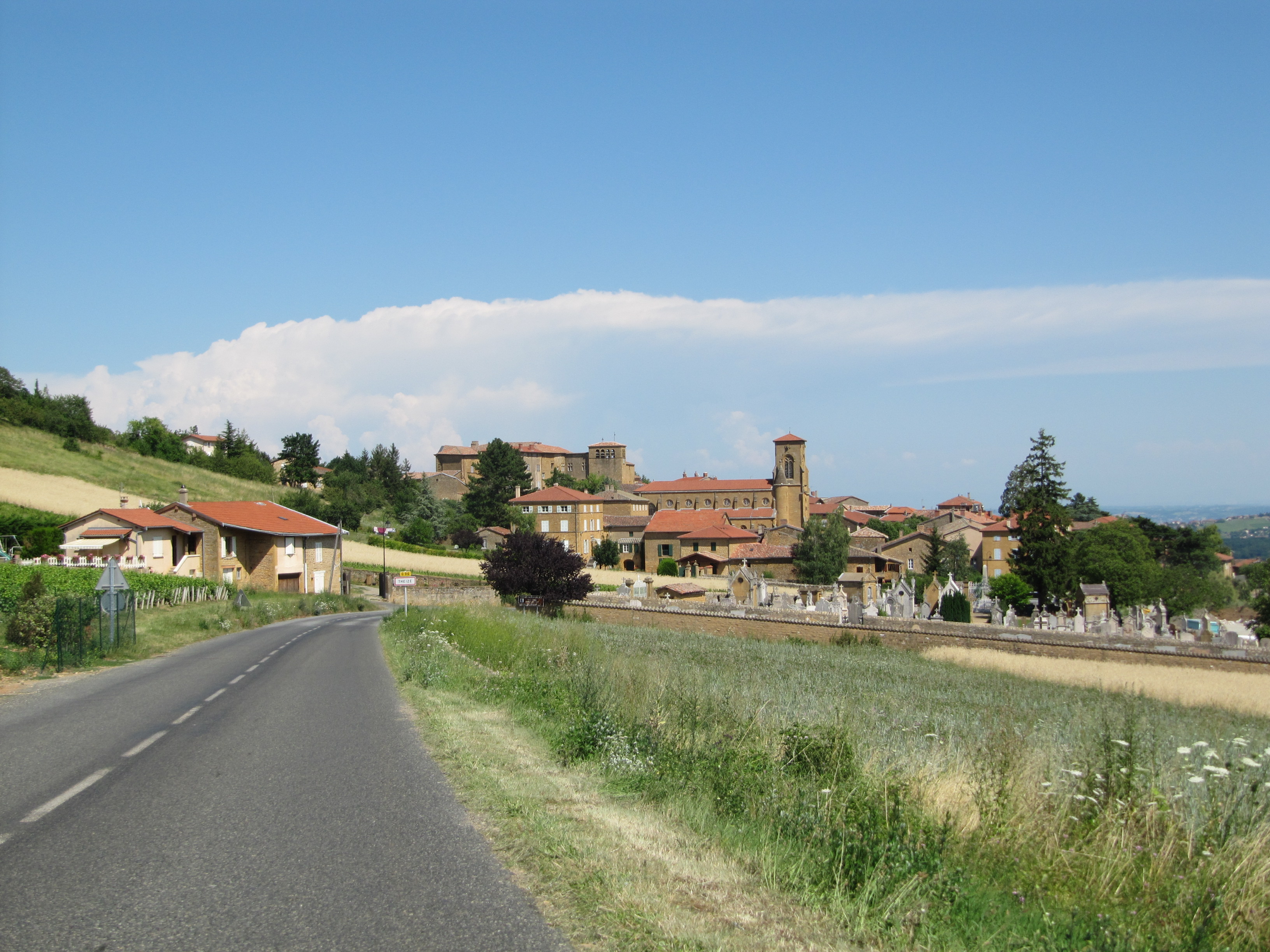
- The road into Theizé

- Coat of arms
- Location of Theizé
- Location within France Location within Auvergne-Rhône-Alpes
- Coordinates: 45°56′26″N 4°37′02″E
- Country: France
- Region: Auvergne-Rhône-Alpes
- Department: Rhône
- Arrondissement: Villefranche-sur-Saône
- Canton: Val d'Oingt

Government
  - Mayor (2020–2026): Christian Vivier-Merle
- Area^{1}: 11.89 km^{2} (4.59 sq mi)
- Elevation: 480.6 m (1,577 ft)
- Highest elevation: 601 m (1,972 ft)
- Lowest elevation: 237 m (778 ft)
- Population (2023): 1,278
  - Density: 107.5/km^{2} (278.4/sq mi)
- Time zone: UTC+01:00 (CET)
  - Summer (DST): UTC+02:00 (CEST)
- INSEE/Postal code: 69246 /69620
- ^{1} French Land Register data, which excludes lakes, ponds, glaciers > 1 km^{2} (0.386 sq mi or 247 acres) and river estuaries.

Theizé (French pronunciation: [tɛze]) is a commune in the Rhône department in eastern France.

== See also ==
- Communes of the Rhône department
