= Balazuc =

Balazuc Balasuc (Occitan)
- Commune
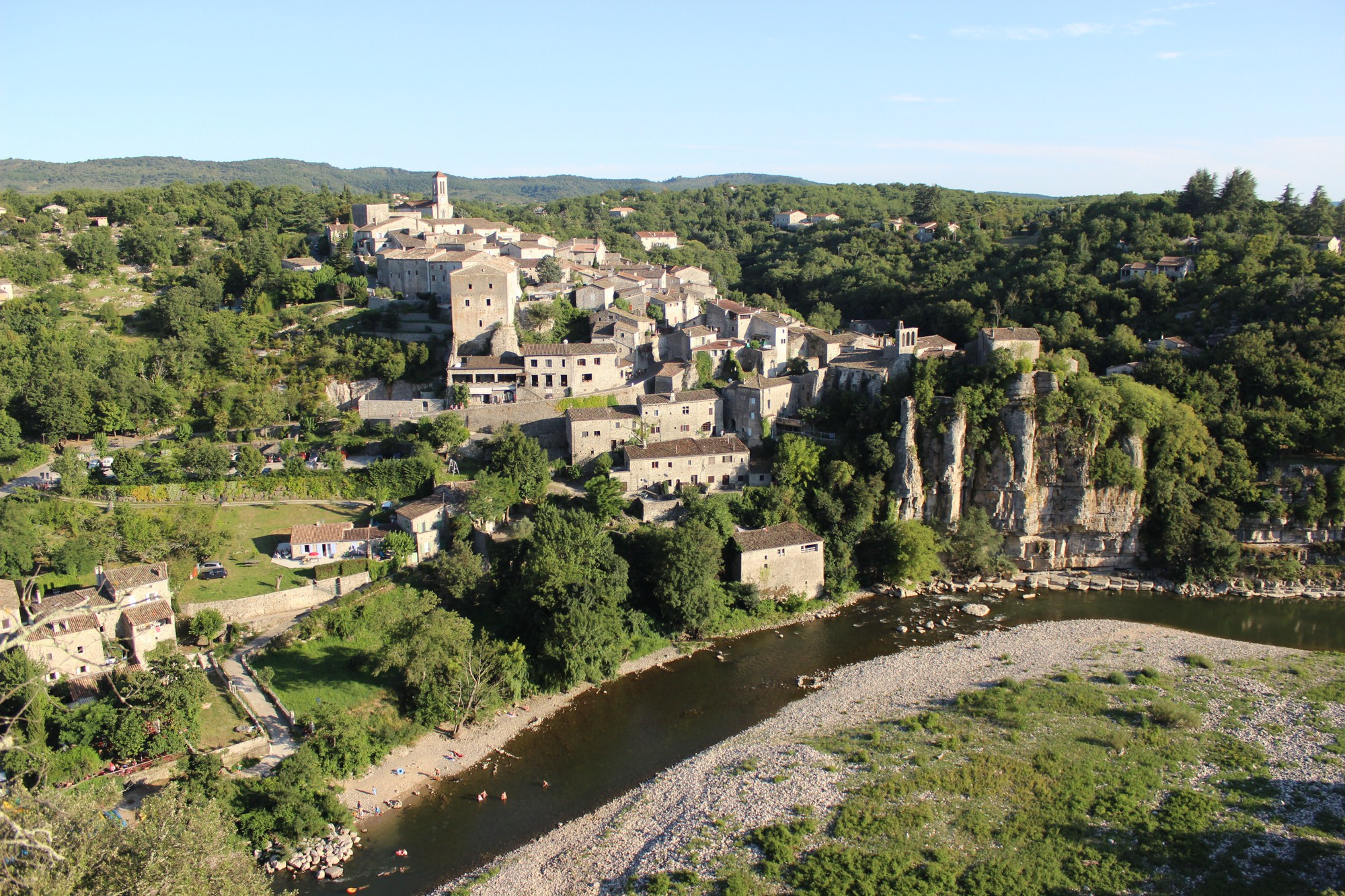
- The Ardèche River in Balazuc

- Coat of arms
- Location of Balazuc
- Location within France Location within Auvergne-Rhône-Alpes
- Coordinates: 44°30′34″N 4°22′23″E
- Country: France
- Region: Auvergne-Rhône-Alpes
- Department: Ardèche
- Arrondissement: Largentière
- Canton: Vallon-Pont-d'Arc
- Intercommunality: Gorges de l'Ardèche

Government
  - Mayor (2020–2026): Bernard Constant
- Area^{1}: 18.9 km^{2} (7.3 sq mi)
- Elevation: 159 m (522 ft)
- Highest elevation: 379 m (1,243 ft)
- Lowest elevation: 113 m (371 ft)
- Population (2023): 389
  - Density: 20.6/km^{2} (53.3/sq mi)
- Demonym: Balazucains
- Time zone: UTC+01:00 (CET)
  - Summer (DST): UTC+02:00 (CEST)
- INSEE/Postal code: 07023 /07120
- Website: www.balazuc.fr
- ^{1} French Land Register data, which excludes lakes, ponds, glaciers > 1 km^{2} (0.386 sq mi or 247 acres) and river estuaries.

Balazuc (French pronunciation: [balazyk]; Occitan: Balasuc) is a commune in the Ardèche department in the Auvergne-Rhône-Alpes region in Southern France.

The village has been labelled a "Village of Character" by the Departmental Committee of Tourism. It is a member of Les Plus Beaux Villages de France (The Most Beautiful Villages of France) Association.

== Geography ==
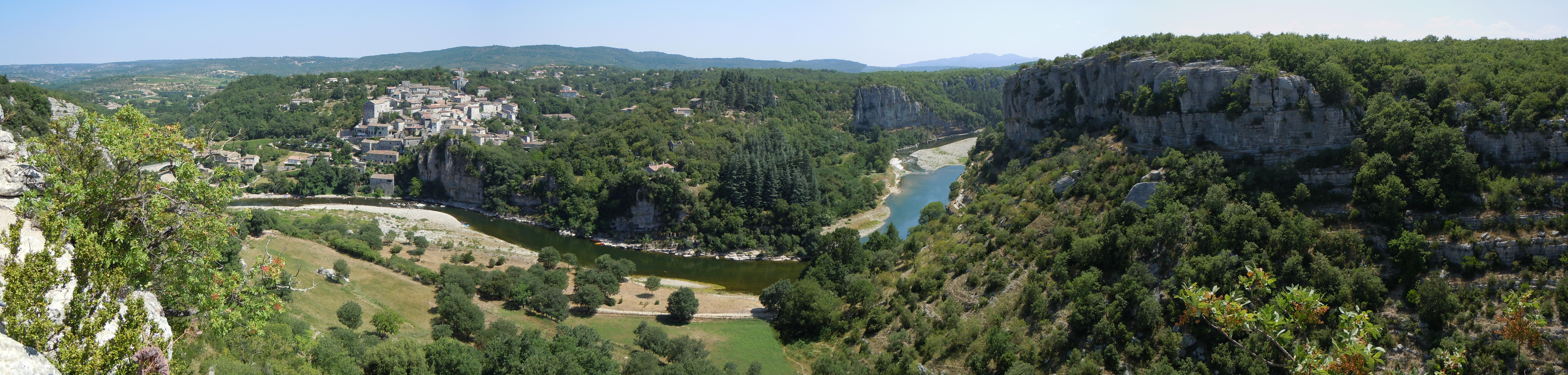
View of the river Ardèche at Balazuc.

Balazuc is located some 16 km south of Aubenas just east of Uzer. Aubenas Aerodrome is just north of the commune. Access to the commune is by the D579 road from Vogüé in the north which passes through the commune east of the village and continues to Pradons in the south. The D294 branches off the D579 in the commune and goes west to the village. Apart from the village there are also the hamlets of Servière, Translatour, Le Retourtier, and Les Louanes in the commune. The commune is forested in the west and east with large areas of farmland in the centre.

The Ardèche river flows through the commune and the village from north to south where it forms part of the southern border before continuing south to join the Rhône at Pont-Saint-Esprit. Numerous tributaries rise on both banks of the Ardèche and flow into the river including the Ruisseau de Mariou, the Ruisseau de Chadenas, the Ruisseau de Chastagnon, the Ruisseau de Tison, and the Ruisseau des Costes.

== History ==
For millennia Balazuc has been the site of a ford on the Ardèche river which was a Gallic stronghold. The name Balazuc comes from the name Baladunum of bal meaning "rock" and "dunum" or "fortified height" in Gallic.

Balazuc has the remains of Neanderthal men who hunted ibex there over 50,000 years ago at the beginning of the last ice age. Farmers arrived in the Neolithic period around 3000 BC. to raise goats and sheep, cultivate the bottom of the depressions, and place their dead in mass graves in stone coffins.

In the Late Bronze Age, around 750 BC., the ford below the village was used. The Gauls, for whom there is no trace, gave it its name: Baladunum. The Gallo-Romans cultivated the Plain des Salles where the great Roman road passed between the Rhône and Nîmes. An early Christian sarcophagus has been found whose high reliefs include biblical scenes (a facsimile is displayed in the town hall). In the Middle Ages the village had a church and a castle from the 11th to 13th centuries in an enclosure which dates them. The castle was originally built in the 12th century and greatly enlarged in the 13th century with a square keep. The ramparts, keep, noble houses, and fortified houses are well preserved.

The village underwent an evolution of houses across the centuries but retained its originality and the medieval character of the village with its narrow streets and its "callades".

Pons de Balazuc, the son of Gérard de Balazuc, was one of the first known lords. He went on the First Crusade and was killed just before the capture of Jerusalem in 1099 at the Siege of Arqa (at the archaeological site of Tel Arqa) near Tripoli (now in Lebanon).

=== Heraldry ===
Arms of Balazuc	Blazon: Paly of six pieces Argent and Sable, in chief Gules charged with three mullets of Or.

== Administration ==
List of Successive Mayors

From	To	Name	Party	Position
1971	1977	Pierre Berre		
1977	1995	Aimé Mouraret		
1995	2001	Guy Boyer		
2001	2012	Josiane Delsart		
2012	2020	Bernard Constant		

== Demography ==
The inhabitants of the commune are known as Balazucains (masculine) or Balazucaines (feminine) in French.

Historical population

Year	Pop.	±% p.a.
1793	550	—
1821	762	+1.17%
1846	881	+0.58%
1872	818	−0.28%
1901	605	−1.03%
1926	469	−1.01%
1946	347	−1.50%
1962	248	−2.08%
1968	218	−2.13%

Year	Pop.	±% p.a.
1975	213	−0.33%
1982	275	+3.72%
1990	277	+0.09%
1999	337	+2.20%
2007	330	−0.26%
2012	356	+1.53%
2017	377	+1.15%
2023	389	+0.52%

Source: EHESS and INSEE

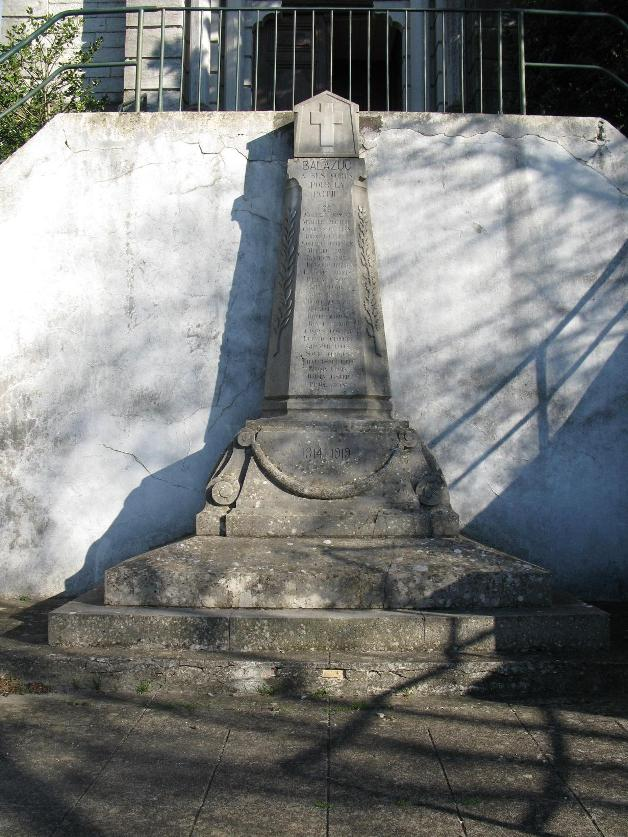
The War Memorial

== Culture and heritage ==
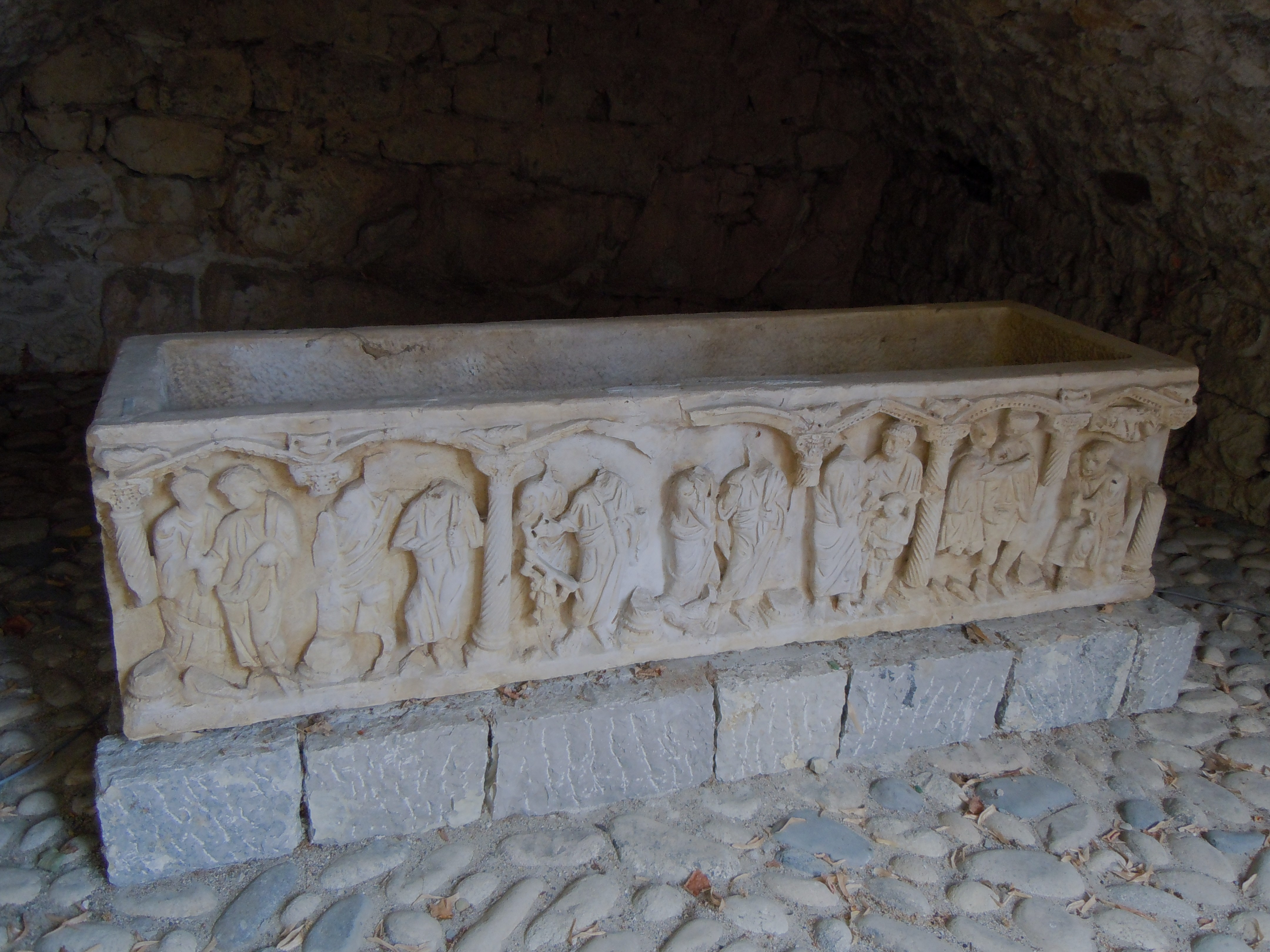
The Balazuc Sarcophagus

=== Civil heritage ===
- A Chateau is registered as an historical monument.
- The picturesque Medieval Village from the 11th and 13th centuries
- A copy of the Balazuc sarcophagus, an early Christian sarcophagus from the end of the 4th or early 5th century found in the hamlet of Salles, visible under the Town Hall
- A Fortified House from the 13th century
- The Viel Audon village cooperative

=== Religious heritage ===
- The Romanesque Church of Saint Madeleine (11th century). is registered as an historical monument. The windows of the Church are by the painter Jacques Yankel. The Church contains many items that are registered as historical objects:
  - 2 Processional Crosses (19th century)
  - A Statue: Virgin Mary (19th century)
  - A Painting: Crucifixion (19th century)
  - The Dome of an old Tabernacle in the gallery (18th century)
  - A Statue: Virgin and child (19th century)
  - A Painting: Rosary (19th century)
  - A Statue: Virgin and child
- A Funeral chapel in ruins from the 13th century
- The Church of Saint Mary Magdelene from the late 19th century

=== Environmental heritage ===
- The Barasses climbing site
- The Ardèche Valley and the Gras de Chauzon are classified as a Zone naturelle d'intérêt écologique, faunistique et floristique (Natural area of ecological interest for flora and fauna).
- The middle Ardèche Valley and its tributaries are classified as a Natura 2000 site of Community importance

=== Cultural events ===
The Roche-Haute Association since 1982 has organised concerts and exhibitions of paintings in the Romanesque church including paintings by: Guillaume Beaugé, Jacques Dromart, and Erik Levesque.

=== Balazuc Picture Gallery ===
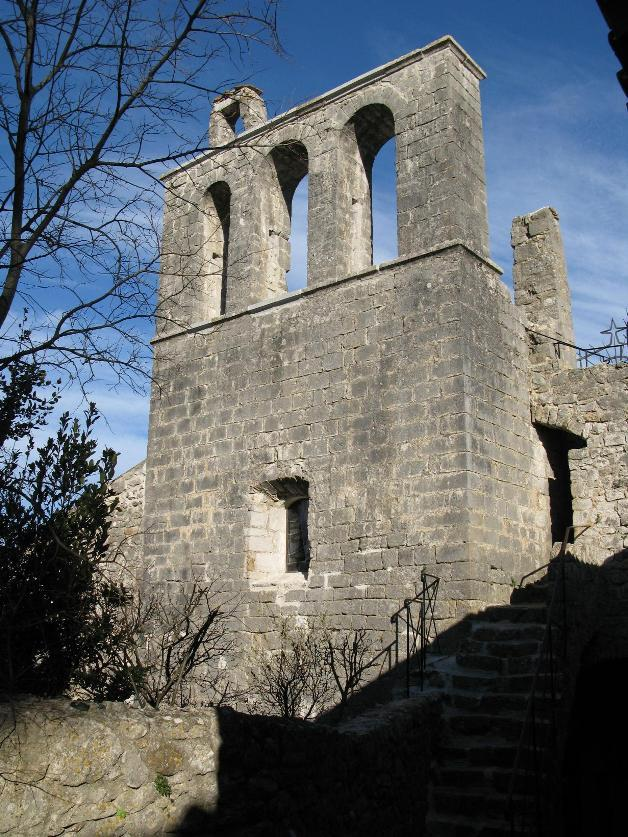
Church of Saint Marie-Madeleine

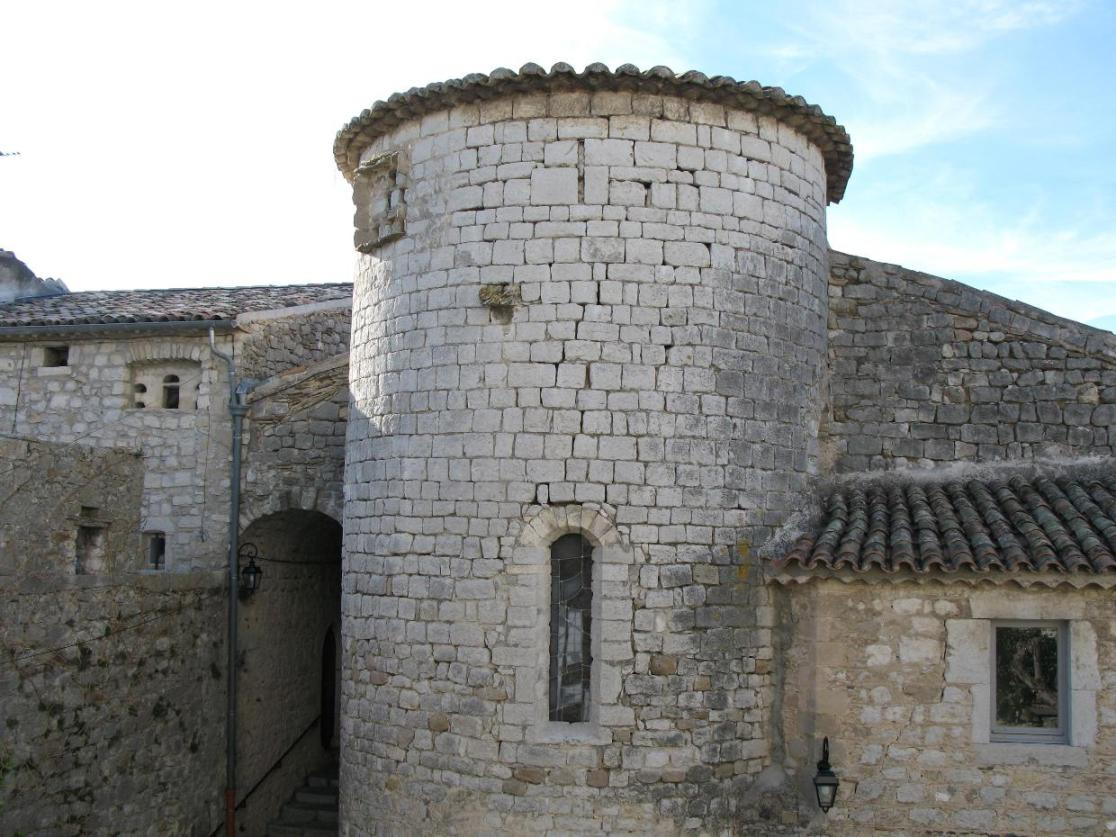
The Church rear

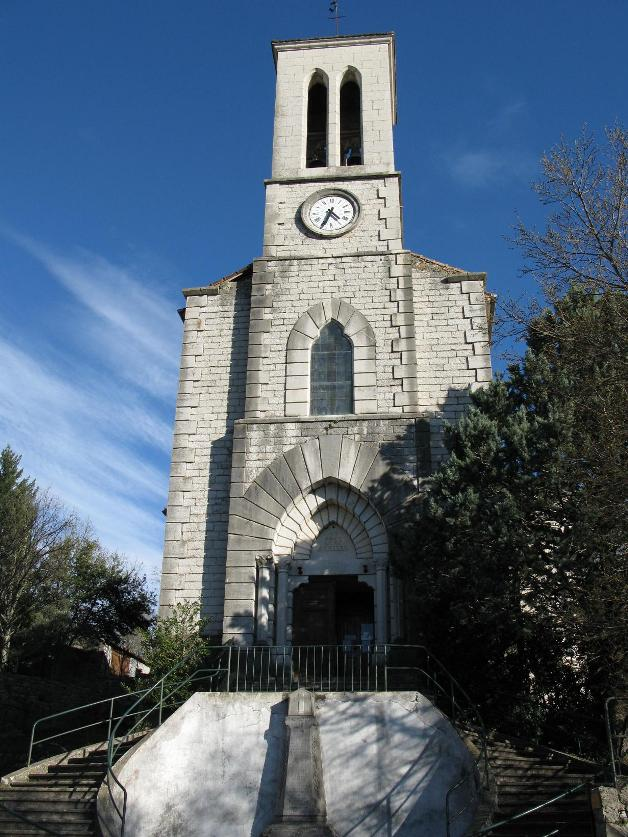
The new Church

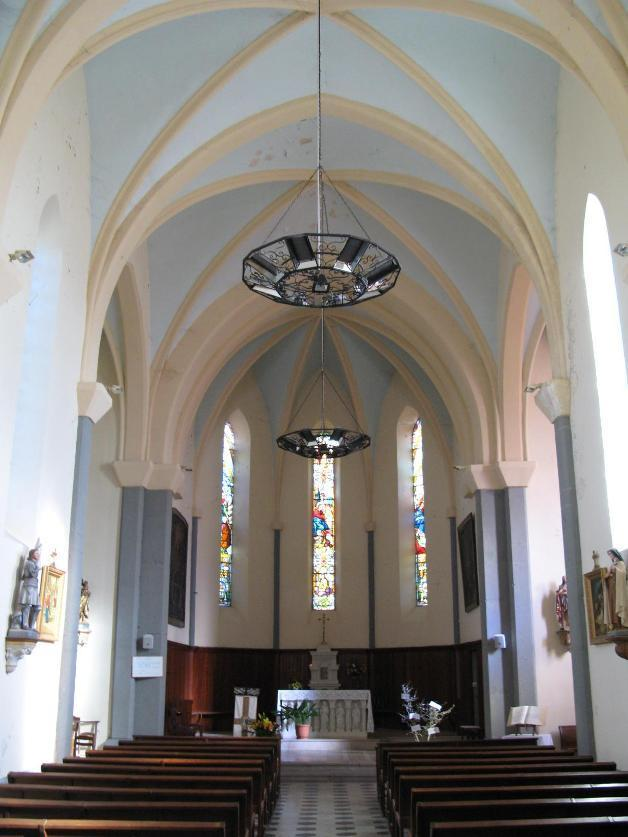
The new Church interior

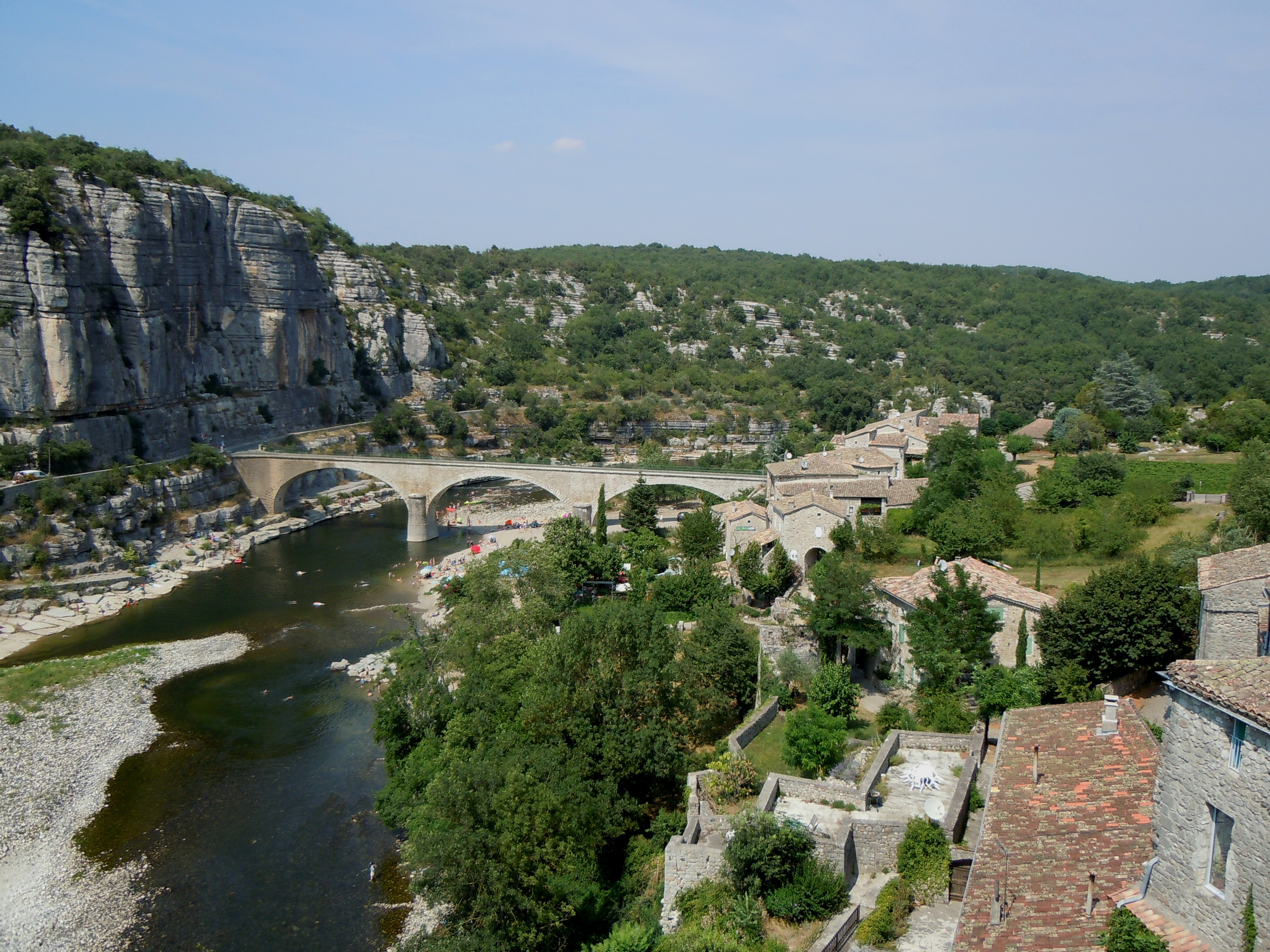
The bridge on the Ardèche

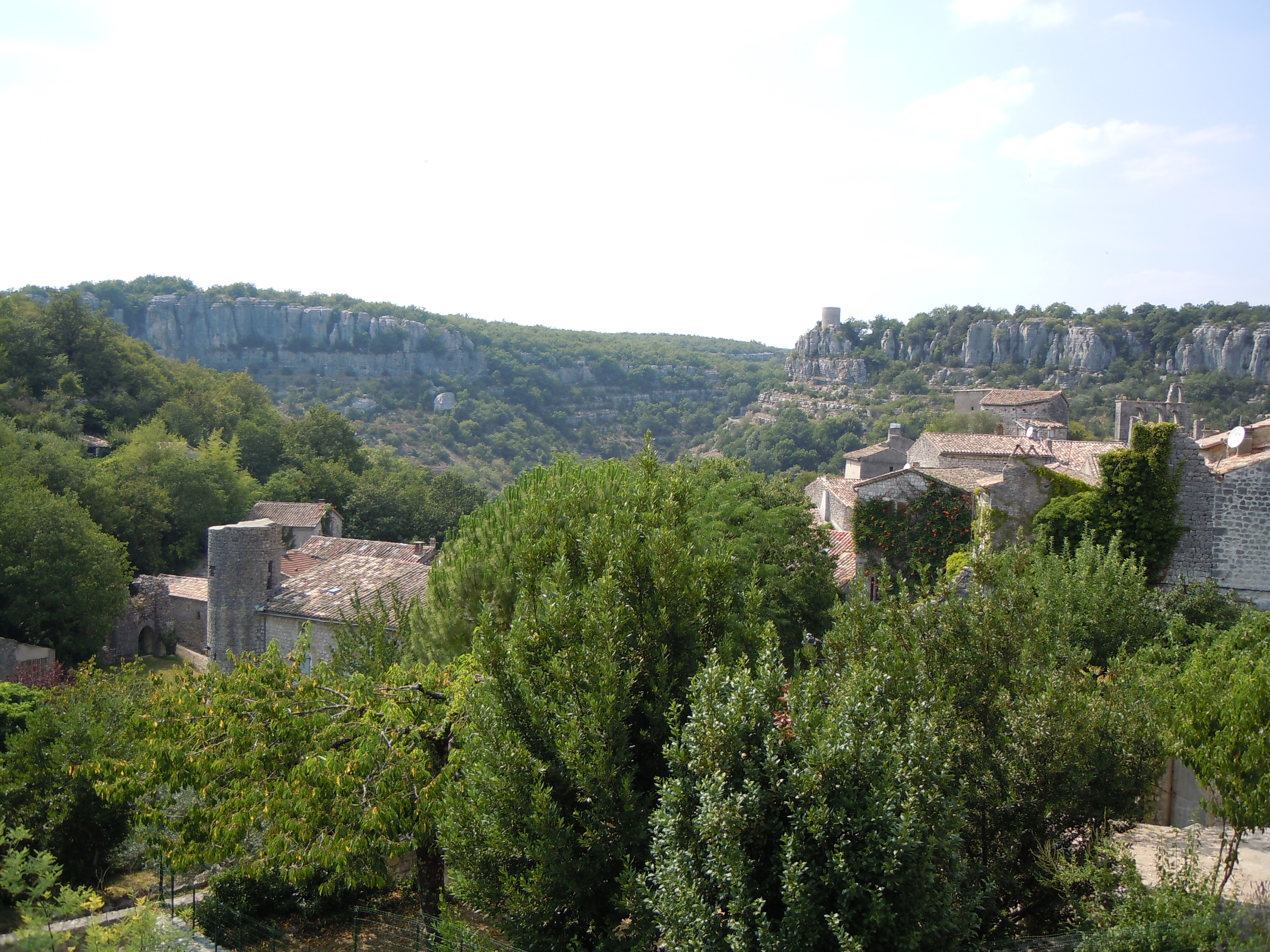
The Summer Tower and the Queen Jeanne Tower

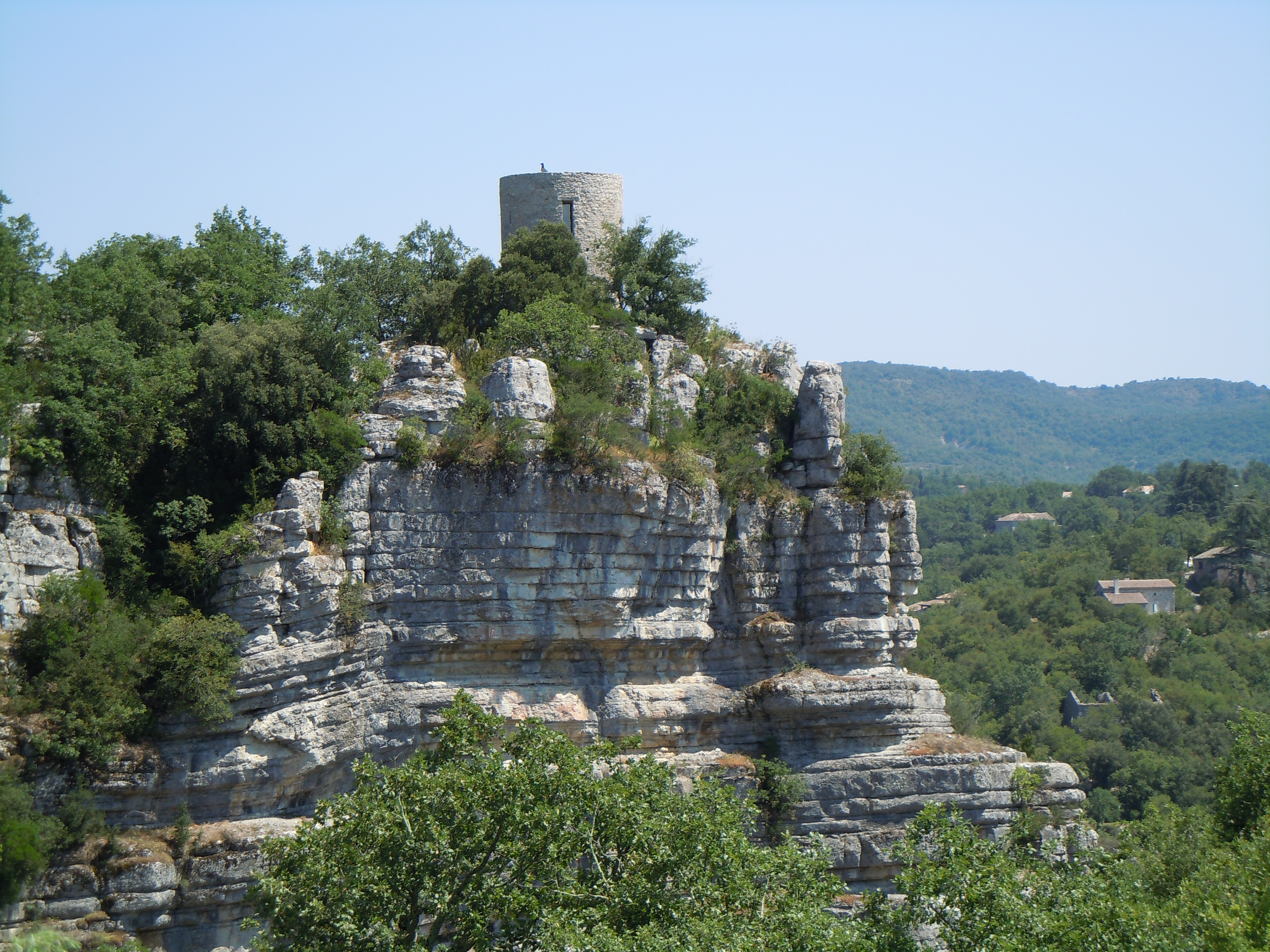
The Queen Jeanne Tower

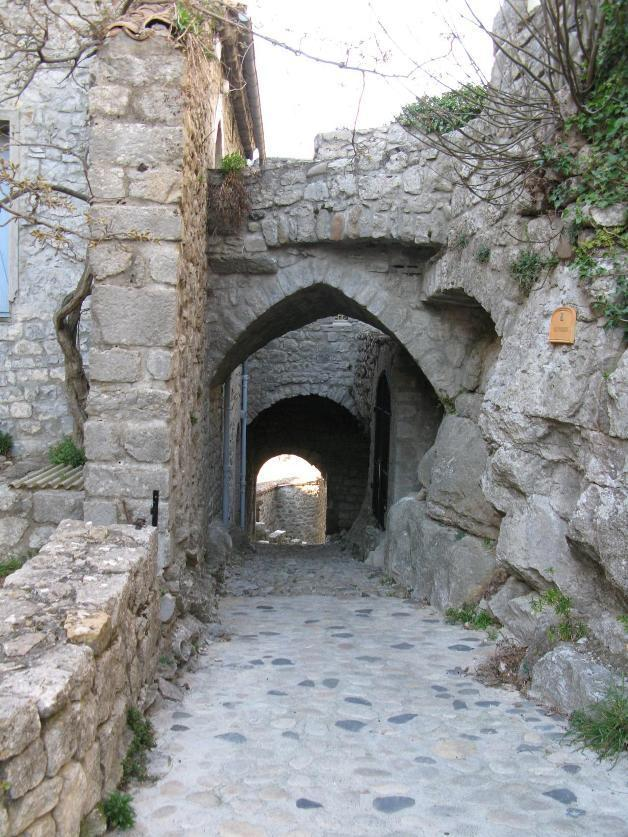
A street in the old village

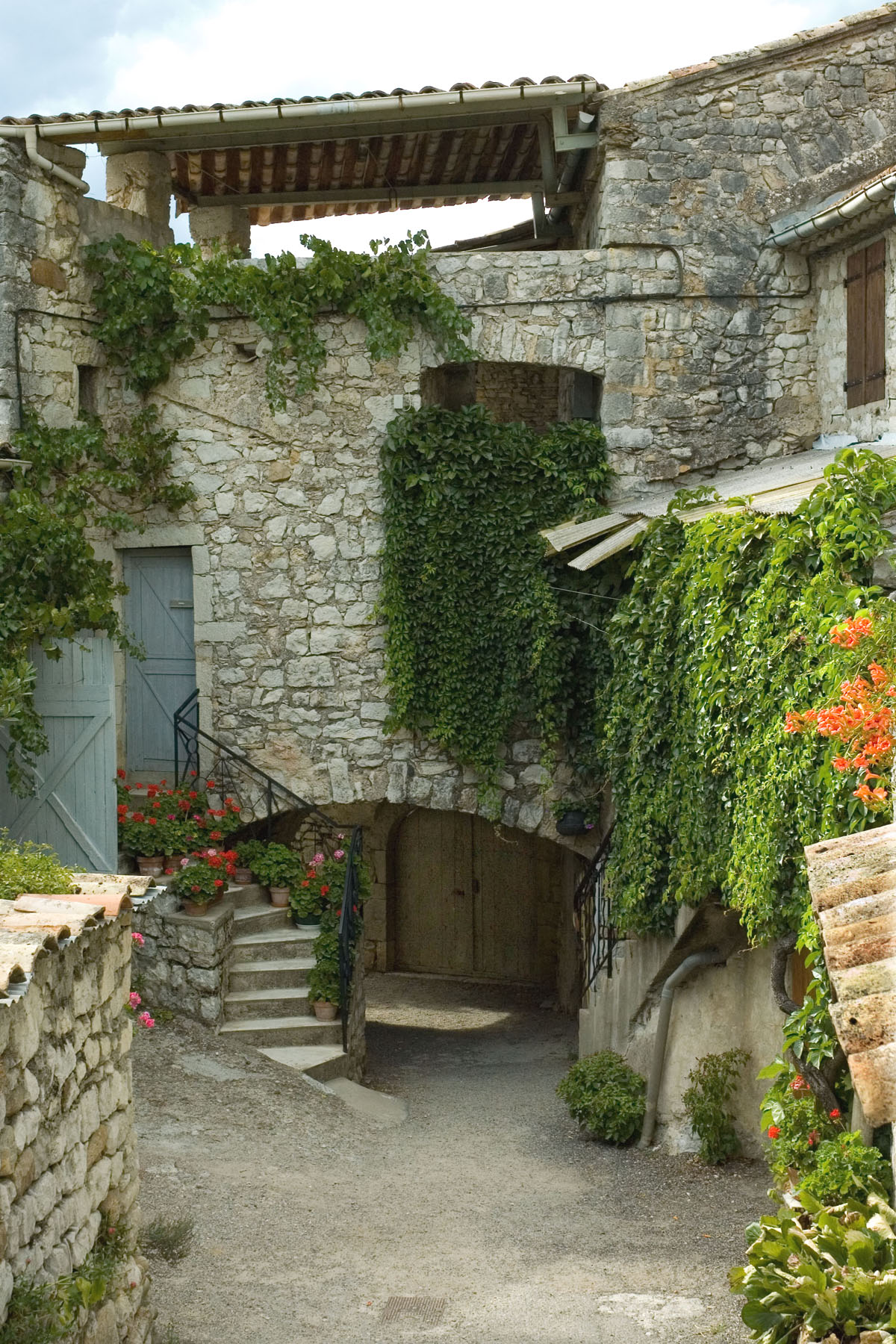
A street in the old village

== Notable people linked to the commune ==
- Guilhem de Balaun, Castellan of Balazuc and Occitan troubadour in the 13th century.
- John M. Merriman, Professor of French History and Geography at Yale University (USA), has written a book on the History of Balazuc: The Stones of Balazuc (Norton Press).
- Aimé Bocquet, pre-historian, in 2011 published a synthetic history of the village since ancient times focusing on life in the Middle Ages based on a tax document dated 1464: Balazuc, medieval village of Vivarais (Éditions Plumes d'Ardèche) (in French).

== See also ==
- Communes of the Ardèche department

=== External links ===
- Balazuc on Géoportail, National Geographic Institute (IGN) website (in French)
- Balazuc on the 1750 Cassini Map
