= House of Joyeuse =

House of Joyeuse Maison de Joyeuse
- Coat of arms

The House of Joyeuse is an old French noble family, particularly influential in the 16th century, which takes its name from the town of Joyeuse, in the Vivarais. It was a branch of the Châteauneuf-Randon family.

It gave three Marshals of France and counts among its members the famous Anne, Duke of Joyeuse (1560–1587), who was one of Les Mignons of King Henry III.

== Origin ==
=== Legend ===
If one believes the legend, the first lords of Joyeuse were warriors of the armies of Pepin the Short or his son Charlemagne. Joyeuse was the name of Charlemagne's sword, mentioned in the Song of Roland.

=== First lords of the house of Anduze ===
In 1230, Bernard VIII d'Anduze, husband of Vierne du Luc, paid homage to King Louis VIII for 21 localities including 4 in Vivarais: Joyeuse, Laurac, Largentière and Chassiers.

== Ascension of the house of Joyeuse ==
According to the work of Pierre de Vaissières, Messieurs de Joyeuse, in the 14th century the fortune of the Joyeuses increased by the marriage of Louis de Joyeuse with Tiburge, lady and baroness of Saint Didier, then the marriage of the son of these, Randon, with Catherine de Chalus. On October 29, 1419, Louis, son of Randon, married Jeanne Louvet, daughter of Jean Louvet, president of the parliament of Provence.

In the next generation, Tanneguy de Joyeuse was seneschal of Lyon.

His son Guillaume married Anne de Balsac d'Antraigues and they had six children. It is the last, Jean, Lord of Saint-Sauveur, who continues the line; he married Françoise de Voisins who brought him important estates in Languedoc. In 1553, the Viscount of Joyeuse called himself “Lieutenant for the King in the Languedoc region”. The succession poses a problem with the death of the eldest child, Jean, killed at the battle of Thérouanne in 1555. The second, Guillaume, being bishop of Alet under the name of Guillaume V, the title passes to the third son, Jean -Paul, Baron d'Arques, but this one died in his turn and the bishop of Alet Guillaume VI (he had succeeded – without having acceded to the priesthood – to his uncle Guillaume V who died in 1540), abandons the ecclesiastical state and resumed the title of viscount of Joyeuse and lieutenant-general in the government of Languedoc. He married Marie de Batarnay, great-granddaughter of Imbert de Batarnay, mother of Anne, first Duke of Joyeuse and his brothers.

Several of them were commissioners of the Abbey of Chambons.

By right, the barons of Joyeuse were among the representatives of Vivarais in the Estates of Languedoc.
