= Tauriers =

- Commune
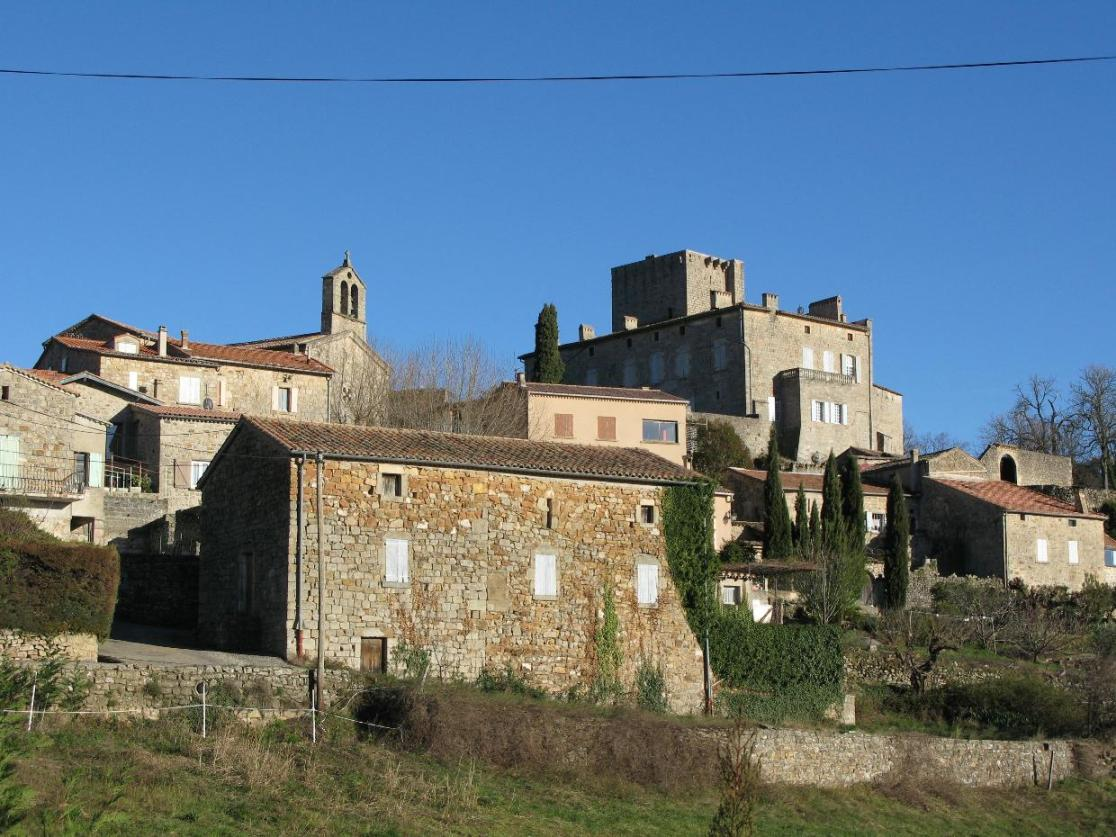
- The church and surrounding buildings in Tauriers

- Coat of arms
- Location of Tauriers
- Location within France Location within Auvergne-Rhône-Alpes
- Coordinates: 44°33′09″N 4°16′53″E
- Country: France
- Region: Auvergne-Rhône-Alpes
- Department: Ardèche
- Arrondissement: Largentière
- Canton: Vallon-Pont-d'Arc
- Intercommunality: Val de Ligne

Government
  - Mayor (2020–2026): Liliane Kolacny
- Area^{1}: 4.51 km^{2} (1.74 sq mi)
- Elevation: 205 m (673 ft)
- Highest elevation: 503 m (1,650 ft)
- Lowest elevation: 219 m (719 ft)
- Population (2023): 203
  - Density: 45.0/km^{2} (117/sq mi)
- Time zone: UTC+01:00 (CET)
  - Summer (DST): UTC+02:00 (CEST)
- INSEE/Postal code: 07318 /07110
- ^{1} French Land Register data, which excludes lakes, ponds, glaciers > 1 km^{2} (0.386 sq mi or 247 acres) and river estuaries.

Tauriers (French pronunciation: [toʁje]; Occitan: Taur) is a commune in the Ardèche department in southern France.

== History ==
- 1790: Tauriers was detached from Chassiers.
- 1 December 1974 : Tauriers attached to Largentière.
- 1 January 1989 : Tauriers was re-established as an independent commune.

== Population ==
Historical population
Year	Pop.	±% p.a.
1968	90	—
1975	111	+3.04%
1982	147	+4.09%
1990	156	+0.75%
1999	166	+0.69%
2007	177	+0.81%
2012	179	+0.22%
2017	192	+1.41%
2023	203	+0.93%
Source: INSEE

Its inhabitants are called Taurierois (male) and Taurieroises (female) in French.

== People linked to the commune ==
- Michel Sima (1912–1987), Polish sculptor, photographer and ceramicist best known for his photographic portraits of Picasso and of almost all the artists of the School of Paris, lived and died in Tauriers.
- Werner Reinisch (1930), painter, engraver.
- Françoise Dasque (1960), actress. Walked between 2010 and 2012 from Tauriers to China and Japan.
- Louis-Gabriel Suchet, Duke of Albufera, (1770–1826), Marshal of the Empire, Pair de France, French soldier during Revolution and the Empire.

== See also ==
- Communes of the Ardèche department
