= Rocher, Ardèche =

Rocher
- Commune
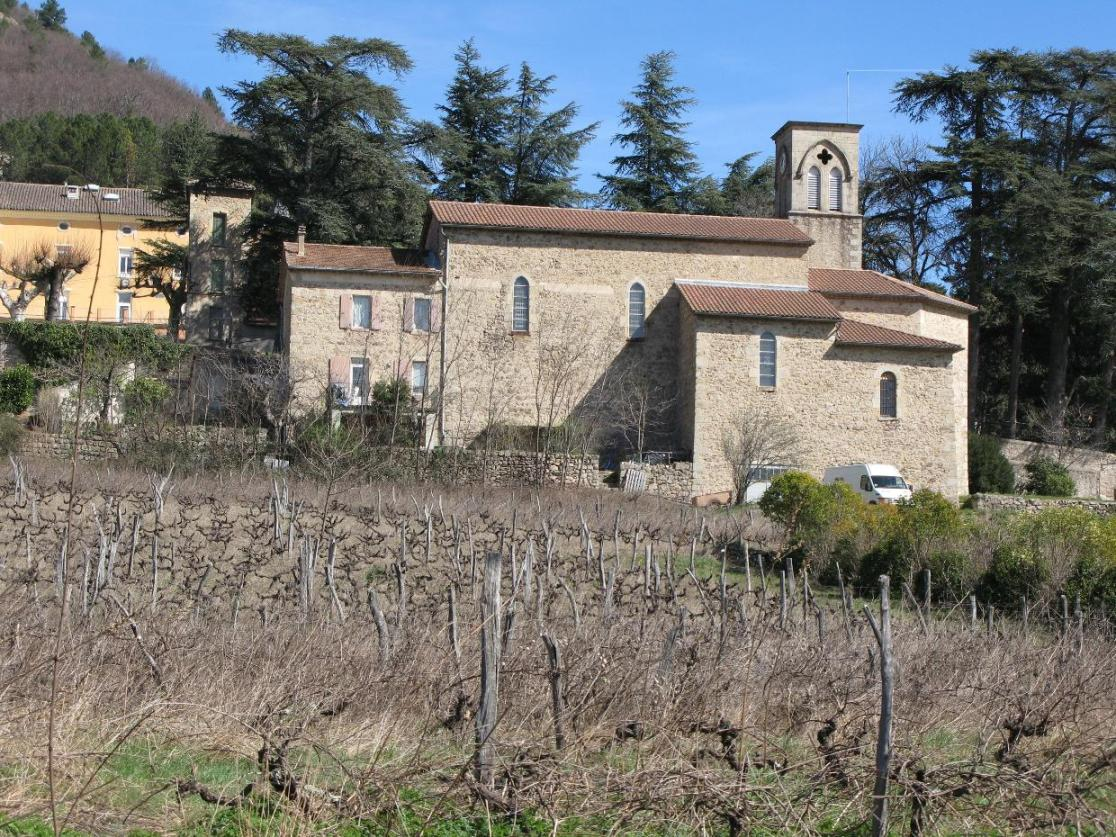
- The church in Rocher
- Location of Rocher
- Location within France Location within Auvergne-Rhône-Alpes
- Coordinates: 44°34′40″N 4°17′08″E
- Country: France
- Region: Auvergne-Rhône-Alpes
- Department: Ardèche
- Arrondissement: Largentière
- Canton: Vallon-Pont-d'Arc
- Intercommunality: Val de Ligne

Government
  - Mayor (2020–2026): Robert Vielfaure
- Area^{1}: 3.09 km^{2} (1.19 sq mi)
- Elevation: 350 m (1,150 ft)
- Highest elevation: 741 m (2,431 ft)
- Lowest elevation: 300 m (980 ft)
- Population (2023): 306
  - Density: 99.0/km^{2} (256/sq mi)
- Time zone: UTC+01:00 (CET)
  - Summer (DST): UTC+02:00 (CEST)
- INSEE/Postal code: 07193 /07110
- ^{1} French Land Register data, which excludes lakes, ponds, glaciers > 1 km^{2} (0.386 sq mi or 247 acres) and river estuaries.

Rocher (French pronunciation: [ʁɔʃe]; Occitan: Rochier) is a commune in the Ardèche department in southern France.

== Population ==
Historical population
Year	Pop.	±% p.a.
1968	205	—
1975	224	+1.27%
1982	244	+1.23%
1990	260	+0.80%
1999	227	−1.50%
2007	275	+2.43%
2012	281	+0.43%
2017	270	−0.80%
2023	306	+2.11%
Source: INSEE

== See also ==
- Communes of the Ardèche department
