= Salavas =

- Commune
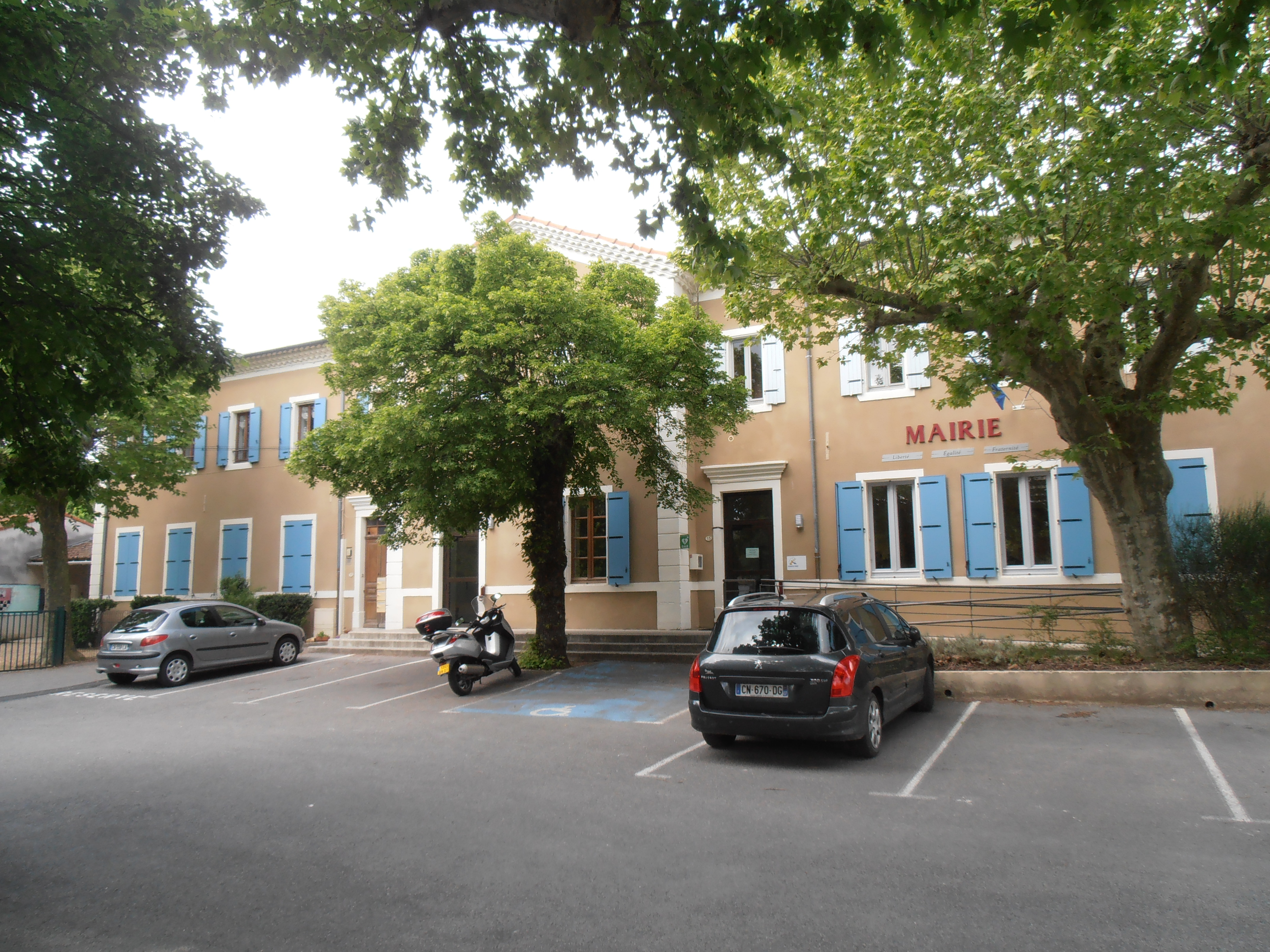
- The town hall in Salavas

- Coat of arms
- Location of Salavas
- Location within France Location within Auvergne-Rhône-Alpes
- Coordinates: 44°23′42″N 4°22′48″E
- Country: France
- Region: Auvergne-Rhône-Alpes
- Department: Ardèche
- Arrondissement: Largentière
- Canton: Vallon-Pont-d'Arc

Government
  - Mayor (2020–2026): Luc Pichon
- Area^{1}: 17.11 km^{2} (6.61 sq mi)
- Elevation: 96 m (315 ft)
- Highest elevation: 522 m (1,713 ft)
- Lowest elevation: 80 m (260 ft)
- Population (2023): 740
  - Density: 43/km^{2} (110/sq mi)
- Time zone: UTC+01:00 (CET)
  - Summer (DST): UTC+02:00 (CEST)
- INSEE/Postal code: 07304 /07150
- ^{1} French Land Register data, which excludes lakes, ponds, glaciers > 1 km^{2} (0.386 sq mi or 247 acres) and river estuaries.

Salavas (French pronunciation: [salavas]; Occitan: Salavàs) is a commune in the Ardèche department in southern France.

== Population ==
Historical population
Year	Pop.	±% p.a.
1968	240	—
1975	299	+3.19%
1982	355	+2.48%
1990	402	+1.57%
1999	504	+2.54%
2007	534	+0.73%
2012	604	+2.49%
2017	682	+2.46%
2023	740	+1.37%
Source: INSEE

== See also ==
- Communes of the Ardèche department
