= Ruoms =

- Commune
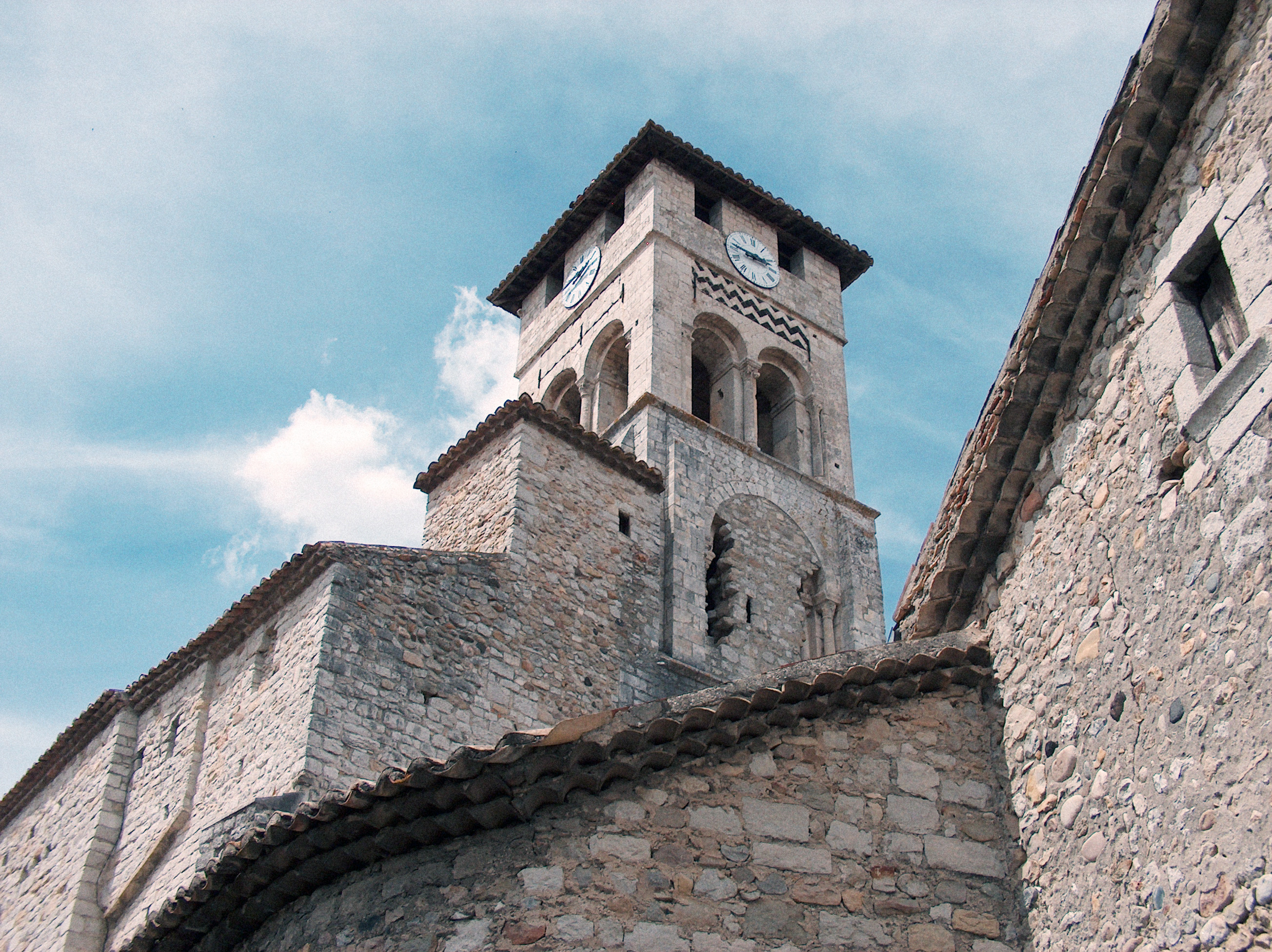
- Church Saint-Pierre-aux-liens of Ruoms

- Coat of arms
- Location of Ruoms
- Location within France Location within Auvergne-Rhône-Alpes
- Coordinates: 44°27′14″N 4°20′34″E
- Country: France
- Region: Auvergne-Rhône-Alpes
- Department: Ardèche
- Arrondissement: Largentière
- Canton: Vallon-Pont-d'Arc

Government
  - Mayor (2020–2026): Guy Clément
- Area^{1}: 12.14 km^{2} (4.69 sq mi)
- Elevation: 120 m (390 ft)
- Highest elevation: 252 m (827 ft)
- Lowest elevation: 80 m (260 ft)
- Population (2023): 2,311
  - Density: 190.4/km^{2} (493.0/sq mi)
- Time zone: UTC+01:00 (CET)
  - Summer (DST): UTC+02:00 (CEST)
- INSEE/Postal code: 07201 /07120
- ^{1} French Land Register data, which excludes lakes, ponds, glaciers > 1 km^{2} (0.386 sq mi or 247 acres) and river estuaries.

Ruoms (French pronunciation: [ʁɥɔ̃s]) is a commune in the Ardèche department in southern France.

== Population ==
Historical population

Year	Pop.	±% p.a.
1793	629	—
1800	575	−1.27%
1806	717	+3.75%
1821	711	−0.06%
1831	839	+1.67%
1836	880	+0.96%
1841	880	+0.00%
1846	964	+1.84%
1851	986	+0.45%
1856	1,044	+1.15%
1861	1,022	−0.43%
1866	1,104	+1.56%
1872	1,122	+0.27%
1876	1,222	+2.16%
1881	1,565	+5.07%
1886	1,713	+1.82%
1891	1,666	−0.55%
1896	1,791	+1.46%
1901	1,788	−0.03%

Year	Pop.	±% p.a.
1906	1,833	+0.50%
1911	1,789	−0.48%
1921	1,468	−1.96%
1926	1,444	−0.33%
1931	1,508	+0.87%
1936	1,423	−1.15%
1946	1,271	−1.12%
1954	1,341	+0.67%
1962	1,474	+1.19%
1968	1,620	+1.59%
1975	1,700	+0.69%
1982	1,794	+0.77%
1990	1,858	+0.44%
1999	2,132	+1.54%
2007	2,225	+0.54%
2012	2,250	+0.22%
2017	2,253	+0.03%
2023	2,311	+0.42%

Source: EHESS and INSEE (1968-2023)

== See also ==
- Communes of the Ardèche department
