= Montréal, Ardèche =

Montréal
- Commune
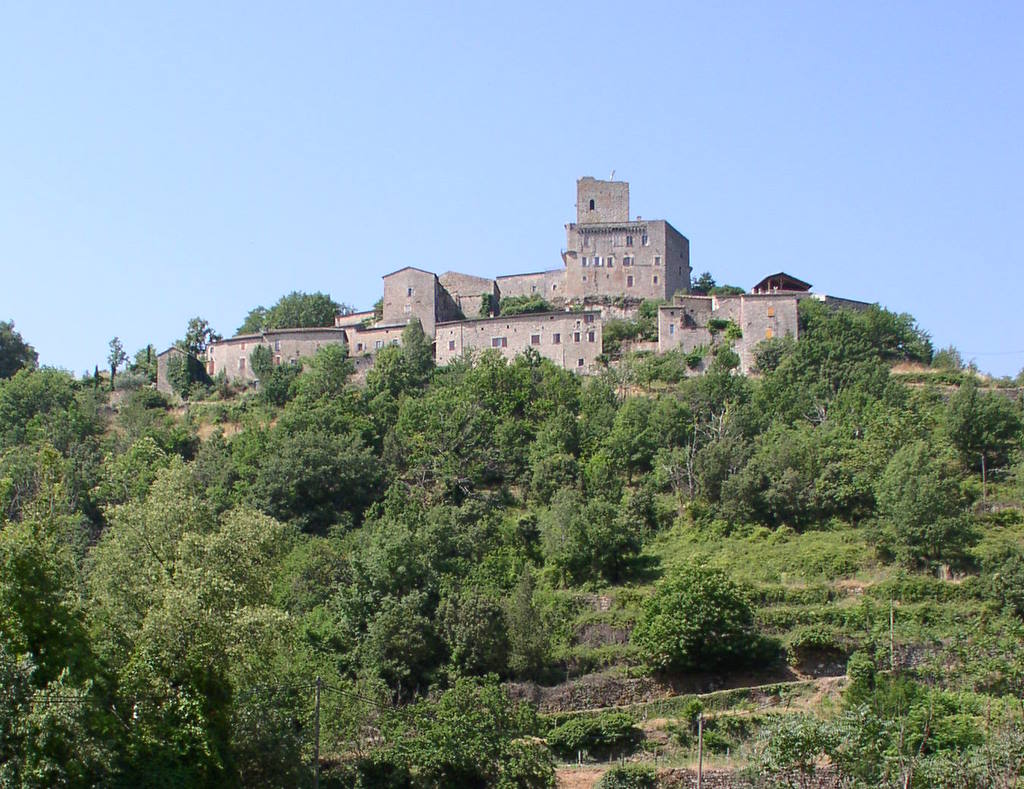
- The castle in Montréal

- Coat of arms
- Location of Montréal
- Location within France Location within Auvergne-Rhône-Alpes
- Coordinates: 44°31′46″N 4°17′37″E
- Country: France
- Region: Auvergne-Rhône-Alpes
- Department: Ardèche
- Arrondissement: Largentière
- Canton: Vallon-Pont-d'Arc

Government
  - Mayor (2020–2026): Bernard Chaniol
- Area^{1}: 6.15 km^{2} (2.37 sq mi)
- Highest elevation: 371 m (1,217 ft)
- Lowest elevation: 120 m (390 ft)
- Population (2023): 573
  - Density: 93.2/km^{2} (241/sq mi)
- Time zone: UTC+01:00 (CET)
  - Summer (DST): UTC+02:00 (CEST)
- INSEE/Postal code: 07162 /07110
- ^{1} French Land Register data, which excludes lakes, ponds, glaciers > 1 km^{2} (0.386 sq mi or 247 acres) and river estuaries.

Montréal (French pronunciation: [mɔ̃ʁe.al]; Occitan: Montriau) is a commune in the Ardèche department in southern France.

== Population ==
Historical population
Year	Pop.	±% p.a.
1968	290	—
1975	276	−0.70%
1982	324	+2.32%
1990	381	+2.05%
1999	462	+2.16%
2007	498	+0.94%
2012	552	+2.08%
2017	572	+0.71%
2023	573	+0.03%
Source: INSEE

== See also ==
- Communes of the Ardèche department
