= Prunet, Ardèche =

Prunet
- Commune
- Location of Prunet
- Location within France Location within Auvergne-Rhône-Alpes
- Coordinates: 44°35′53″N 4°15′41″E
- Country: France
- Region: Auvergne-Rhône-Alpes
- Department: Ardèche
- Arrondissement: Largentière
- Canton: Vallon-Pont-d'Arc
- Intercommunality: Val de Ligne

Government
  - Mayor (2020–2026): Laurence Allefresde
- Area^{1}: 8.81 km^{2} (3.40 sq mi)
- Elevation: 580 m (1,900 ft)
- Highest elevation: 1,193 m (3,914 ft)
- Lowest elevation: 376 m (1,234 ft)
- Population (2023): 134
  - Density: 15.2/km^{2} (39.4/sq mi)
- Time zone: UTC+01:00 (CET)
  - Summer (DST): UTC+02:00 (CEST)
- INSEE/Postal code: 07187 /07110
- ^{1} French Land Register data, which excludes lakes, ponds, glaciers > 1 km^{2} (0.386 sq mi or 247 acres) and river estuaries.

Prunet (French pronunciation: [pʁynɛ]) is a commune in the Ardèche department in southern France.

== Population ==
Historical population
Year	Pop.	±% p.a.
1968	150	—
1975	118	−3.37%
1982	113	−0.62%
1990	103	−1.15%
1999	104	+0.11%
2007	133	+3.12%
2012	136	+0.45%
2017	132	−0.60%
2023	134	+0.25%
Source: INSEE

== See also ==
- Communes of the Ardèche department
