= Saint-Maurice-d'Ardèche =

- Commune
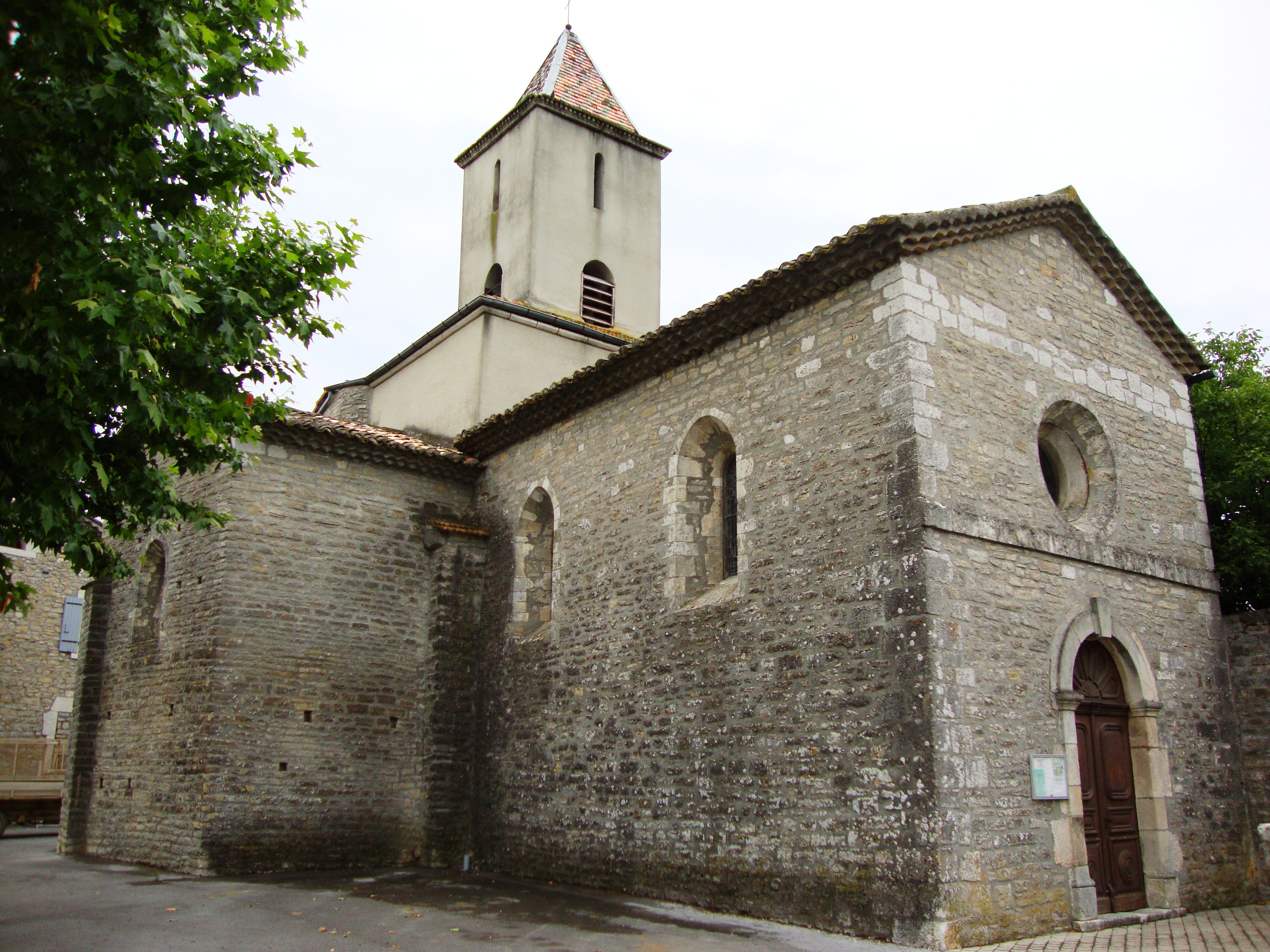
- The church in Saint-Maurice-d'Ardèche
- Location of Saint-Maurice-d'Ardèche
- Location within France Location within Auvergne-Rhône-Alpes
- Coordinates: 44°31′19″N 4°24′01″E
- Country: France
- Region: Auvergne-Rhône-Alpes
- Department: Ardèche
- Arrondissement: Largentière
- Canton: Vallon-Pont-d'Arc

Government
  - Mayor (2020–2026): Jean-Claude Bacconnier
- Area^{1}: 5.19 km^{2} (2.00 sq mi)
- Elevation: 168 m (551 ft)
- Highest elevation: 300 m (980 ft)
- Lowest elevation: 121 m (397 ft)
- Population (2023): 375
  - Density: 72.3/km^{2} (187/sq mi)
- Time zone: UTC+01:00 (CET)
  - Summer (DST): UTC+02:00 (CEST)
- INSEE/Postal code: 07272 /07200
- ^{1} French Land Register data, which excludes lakes, ponds, glaciers > 1 km^{2} (0.386 sq mi or 247 acres) and river estuaries.

Saint-Maurice-d'Ardèche (Occitan: Sant-Maurici d'Ardèche) is a commune in the Ardèche department in southern France.

== Population ==
Historical population
Year	Pop.	±% p.a.
1968	170	—
1975	167	−0.25%
1982	206	+3.04%
1990	214	+0.48%
1999	241	+1.33%
2007	295	+2.56%
2012	335	+2.58%
2017	306	−1.79%
2023	375	+3.45%
Source: INSEE

== See also ==
- Communes of the Ardèche department
