= Sampzon =

- Commune
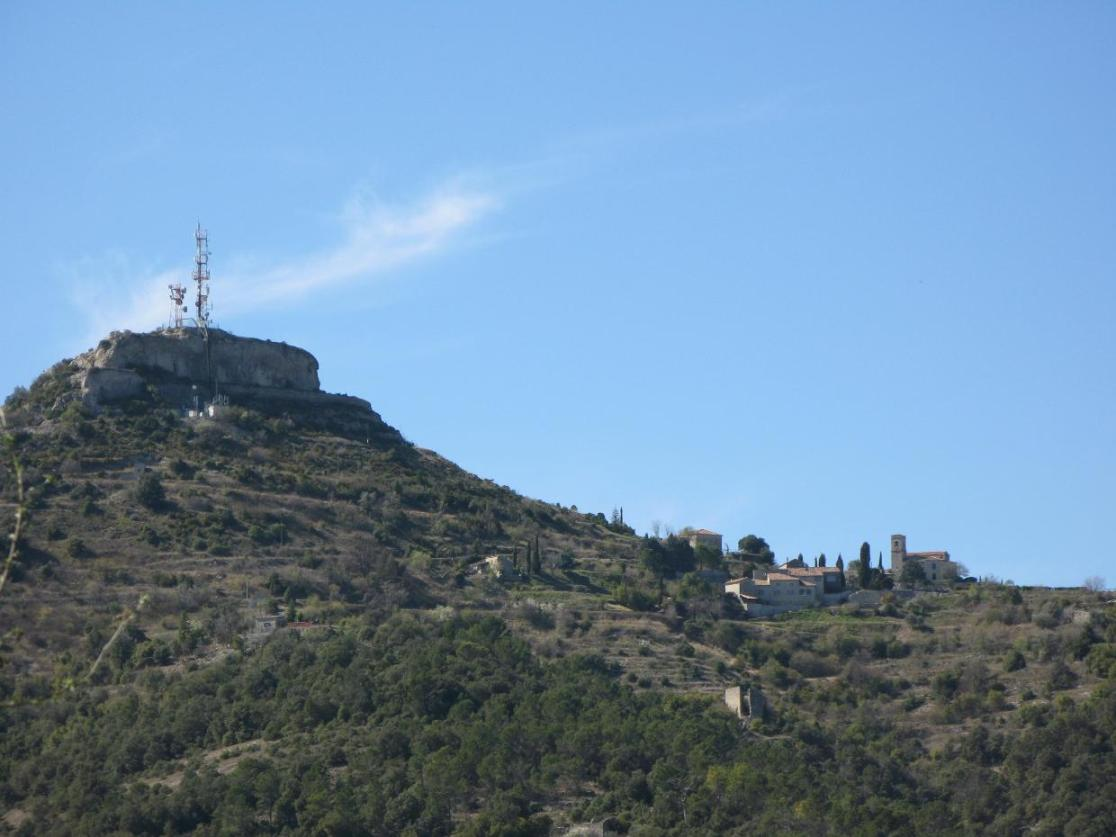
- The Rock of Sampzon

- Coat of arms
- Location of Sampzon
- Location within France Location within Auvergne-Rhône-Alpes
- Coordinates: 44°25′32″N 4°20′39″E
- Country: France
- Region: Auvergne-Rhône-Alpes
- Department: Ardèche
- Arrondissement: Largentière
- Canton: Vallon-Pont-d'Arc

Government
  - Mayor (2020–2026): Yvon Ventalon
- Area^{1}: 8.39 km^{2} (3.24 sq mi)
- Elevation: 110 m (360 ft)
- Highest elevation: 449 m (1,473 ft)
- Lowest elevation: 84 m (276 ft)
- Population (2023): 241
  - Density: 28.7/km^{2} (74.4/sq mi)
- Time zone: UTC+01:00 (CET)
  - Summer (DST): UTC+02:00 (CEST)
- INSEE/Postal code: 07306 /07120
- ^{1} French Land Register data, which excludes lakes, ponds, glaciers > 1 km^{2} (0.386 sq mi or 247 acres) and river estuaries.

Sampzon (French pronunciation: [sɑ̃zɔ̃]) is a commune in the Ardèche department in southern France.

== Population ==
Historical population
Year	Pop.	±% p.a.
1968	108	—
1975	127	+2.34%
1982	121	−0.69%
1990	163	+3.79%
1999	183	+1.29%
2007	213	+1.92%
2012	221	+0.74%
2017	228	+0.63%
2023	241	+0.93%
Source: INSEE

== See also ==
- Communes of the Ardèche department
