= Chauzon =

- Commune
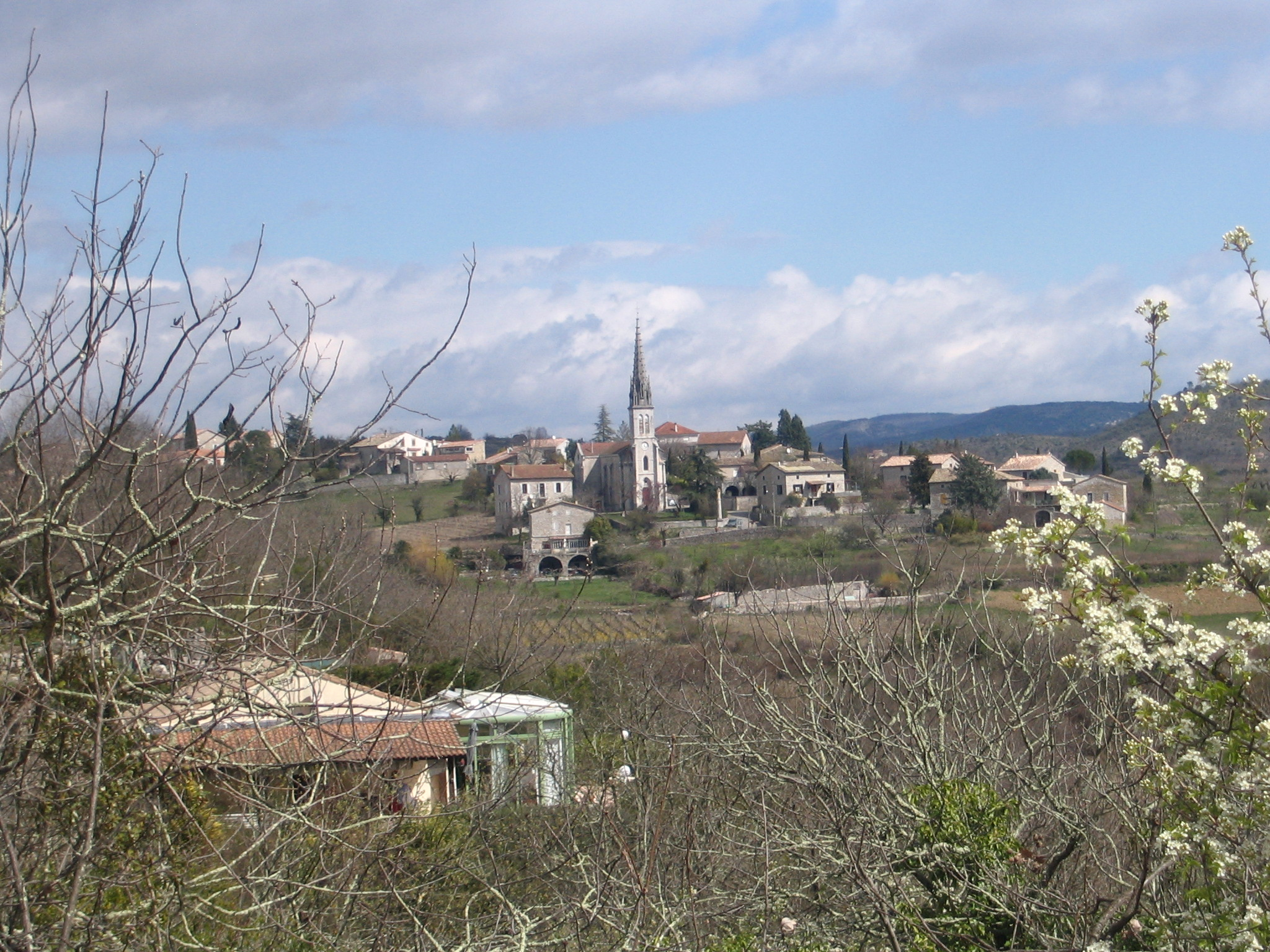
- A general view of Chauzon
- Location of Chauzon
- Location within France Location within Auvergne-Rhône-Alpes
- Coordinates: 44°29′09″N 4°21′39″E
- Country: France
- Region: Auvergne-Rhône-Alpes
- Department: Ardèche
- Arrondissement: Largentière
- Canton: Vallon-Pont-d'Arc

Government
  - Mayor (2020–2026): Jean-Claude Delon
- Area^{1}: 10.68 km^{2} (4.12 sq mi)
- Elevation: 180 m (590 ft)
- Highest elevation: 326 m (1,070 ft)
- Lowest elevation: 100 m (330 ft)
- Population (2023): 422
  - Density: 39.5/km^{2} (102/sq mi)
- Time zone: UTC+01:00 (CET)
  - Summer (DST): UTC+02:00 (CEST)
- INSEE/Postal code: 07061 /07120
- ^{1} French Land Register data, which excludes lakes, ponds, glaciers > 1 km^{2} (0.386 sq mi or 247 acres) and river estuaries.

Chauzon (French pronunciation: [ʃozɔ̃]) is a commune in the Ardèche department in southern France.

== Population ==
Historical population
Year	Pop.	±% p.a.
1968	181	—
1975	168	−1.06%
1982	210	+3.24%
1990	224	+0.81%
1999	255	+1.45%
2007	317	+2.76%
2012	349	+1.94%
2017	386	+2.04%
2023	422	+1.50%
Source: INSEE

== See also ==
- Communes of the Ardèche department
