= Pons of Balazun =

Pons of Balazun (died 1099) was an Occitan nobleman who participated in the First Crusade and in the creation of one of its earliest histories, the Book of the Franks Who Captured Jerusalem.

Pons was in the army of Count Raymond IV of Toulouse, and accompanied the count into the church of Saint Peter in Antioch at the discovery of the Holy Lance on the evening of 14 June 1098. He died at the siege of Arqa in 1099 before the capture of Jerusalem. According to Archbishop William II of Tyre, "before the walls of Arka ... Pons de Balazune, a nobleman of high rank and a friend of the count of Toulouse ... perished from the blow of a stone missile" alongside Anselm de Ribemont. He was sufficiently prominent in the count's following to be mentioned by several independent accounts of the crusade. He is mentioned in the Historia Hierosolymitana, the Historia de Hierosolymitano itinere, the Historia peregrinorum and the Historia de via Hierosolymitana.

The identification of Pons's toponymic has been a matter of debate. The Latin of the Book of the Franks gives his name as Pontius de Baladuno. The editors of the Recueil des historiens des croisades suggested that this referred to a place called Balon or Ballon in modern French. Léon Védel identified it as Balazuc, citing a case of just such a Latinization from 1504. There exists an 11th-century charter issued by a Pons of Balazuc to his wife, Jaquette de Trevenne, and his son, Jordan. This Jordan is known from a separate charter to have married in 1120. Védel believed that this was Pons and his family. He further identified a Gerard of Balazuc as Pons's father.

The Book of the Franks begins with a dedication to Leodegar, bishop of Viviers, by its two authors, Pons of Balazun and Raymond of Aguilers. Pons may have been a vassal of the bishop. He and Raymond, who was from the neighbouring diocese of Le Puy, probably knew each other in France before the crusade. In its finished form, however, the book is the work of Raymond. Pons did not live to see its completion, since it was finished only after the fall of Jerusalem. According to Raymond, commenting on Pons's death, he wrote the account at the instigation of Pons. It is unknown whether Pons had any other role or whether any particular sections should be attributed primarily to him. As one present in battles and in Count Raymond's counsels, Pons may have been mainly a source of information for Raymond, but this is speculation.

== Sources ==
- France, John (1967). A Critical Edition of the Historia Francorum Qui Ceperunt Iherusalem of Raymond of Aguilers (PDF) (PhD diss.). University of Nottingham.
- Riley-Smith, Jonathan (1997). The First Crusaders, 1095–1131. Cambridge University Press.
- Védel, Léon (1884). "A travers le Vivrais: Balazuc et Pons de Balazuc". Revue Lyonnaise: 153–189.
- William, Archbishop of Tyre (1943). Emily Atwater Babcock; A. C. Krey (eds.). A History of Deeds Done Beyond the Sea. Columbia University Press.
