= Laurac-en-Vivarais =

- Commune
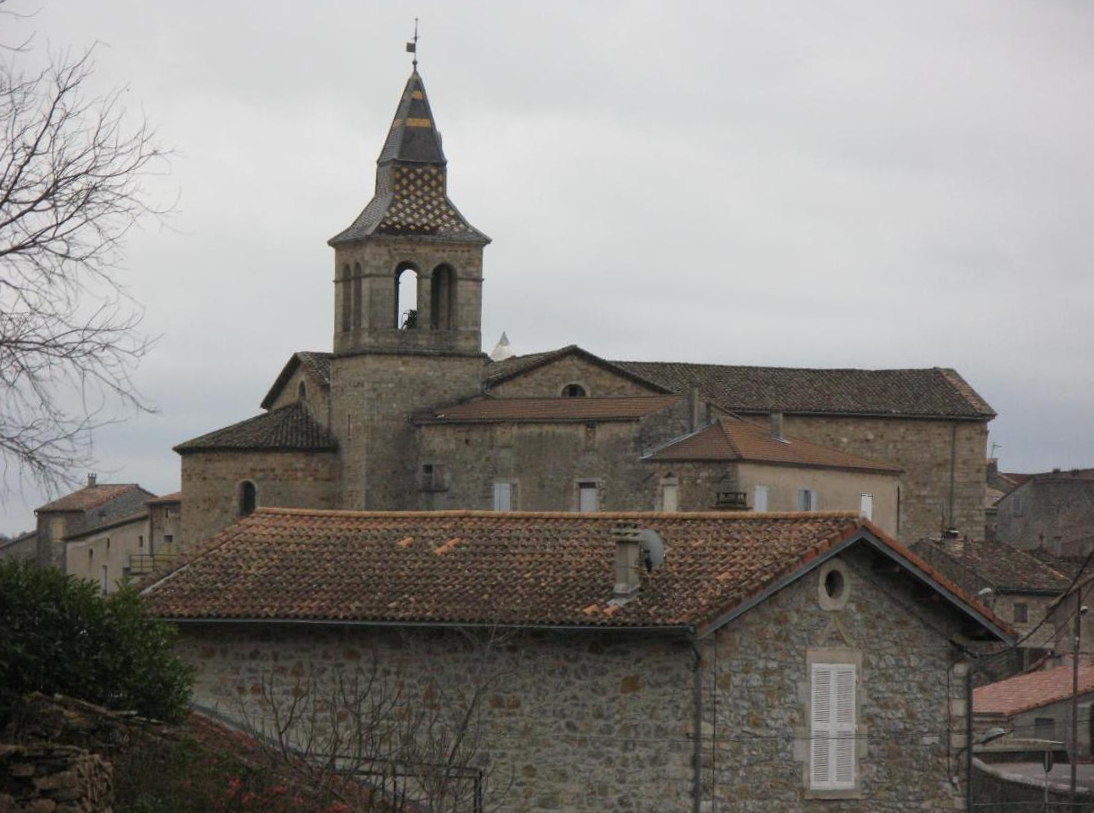
- The church in Laurac-en-Vivarais

- Coat of arms
- Location of Laurac-en-Vivarais
- Location within France Location within Auvergne-Rhône-Alpes
- Coordinates: 44°30′34″N 4°17′27″E
- Country: France
- Region: Auvergne-Rhône-Alpes
- Department: Ardèche
- Arrondissement: Largentière
- Canton: Vallon-Pont-d'Arc

Government
  - Mayor (2020–2026): Didier Nury
- Area^{1}: 8.97 km^{2} (3.46 sq mi)
- Elevation: 192 m (630 ft)
- Highest elevation: 373 m (1,224 ft)
- Lowest elevation: 149 m (489 ft)
- Population (2023): 1,045
  - Density: 116/km^{2} (302/sq mi)
- Time zone: UTC+01:00 (CET)
  - Summer (DST): UTC+02:00 (CEST)
- INSEE/Postal code: 07134 /07110
- ^{1} French Land Register data, which excludes lakes, ponds, glaciers > 1 km^{2} (0.386 sq mi or 247 acres) and river estuaries.

Laurac-en-Vivarais (French pronunciation: [loʁak ɑ̃ vivaʁɛ], literally Laurac in Vivarais; Occitan: Laurac) is a commune in the Ardèche department in southern France.

== Population ==
Historical population
| Year | Pop. | ±% p.a. |
|---|---|---|
| 1968 | 802 | — |
| 1975 | 763 | −0.71% |
| 1982 | 797 | +0.62% |
| 1990 | 789 | −0.13% |
| 1999 | 784 | −0.07% |
| 2007 | 888 | +1.57% |
| 2012 | 936 | +1.06% |
| 2017 | 995 | +1.23% |
| 2023 | 1,045 | +0.82% |
Source: INSEE

== See also ==
- Communes of the Ardèche department
