= Bessas =

- Commune
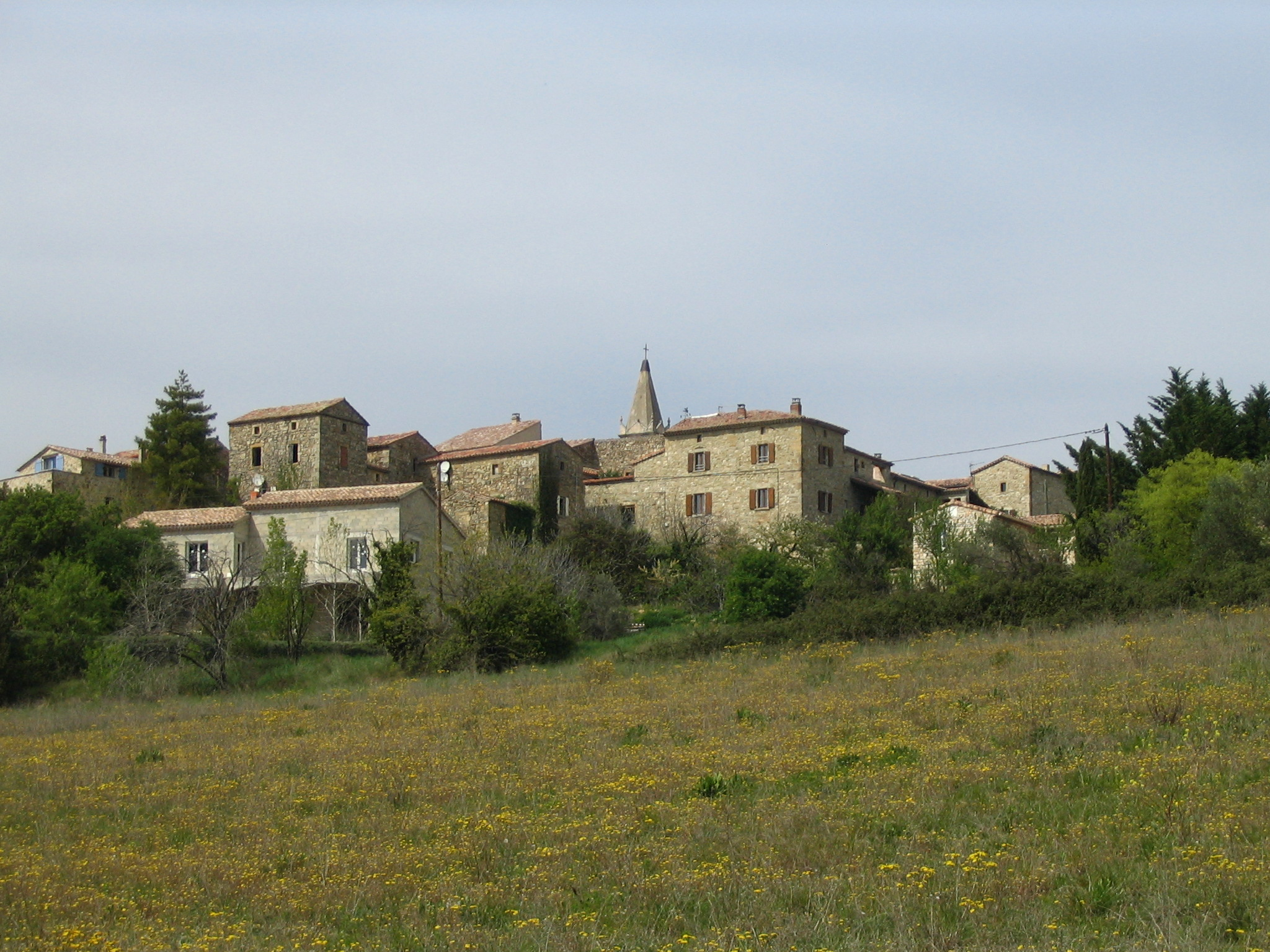
- A general view of Bessas
- Location of Bessas
- Location within France Location within Auvergne-Rhône-Alpes
- Coordinates: 44°20′44″N 4°18′11″E
- Country: France
- Region: Auvergne-Rhône-Alpes
- Department: Ardèche
- Arrondissement: Largentière
- Canton: Vallon-Pont-d'Arc

Government
  - Mayor (2020–2026): Alain Chambon
- Area^{1}: 17.18 km^{2} (6.63 sq mi)
- Elevation: 296 m (971 ft)
- Highest elevation: 504 m (1,654 ft)
- Lowest elevation: 153 m (502 ft)
- Population (2023): 234
  - Density: 13.6/km^{2} (35.3/sq mi)
- Time zone: UTC+01:00 (CET)
  - Summer (DST): UTC+02:00 (CEST)
- INSEE/Postal code: 07033 /07150
- ^{1} French Land Register data, which excludes lakes, ponds, glaciers > 1 km^{2} (0.386 sq mi or 247 acres) and river estuaries.

Bessas (French pronunciation: [bɛsas]; Occitan: Beçaç) is a commune in the Ardèche department in southern France.

== Population ==
Historical population
Year	Pop.	±% p.a.
1968	146	—
1975	147	+0.10%
1982	169	+2.01%
1990	147	−1.73%
1999	166	+1.36%
2007	213	+3.17%
2012	192	−2.05%
2017	216	+2.38%
2023	234	+1.34%
Source: INSEE

== See also ==
- Communes of the Ardèche department
