= Vagnas =

- Commune
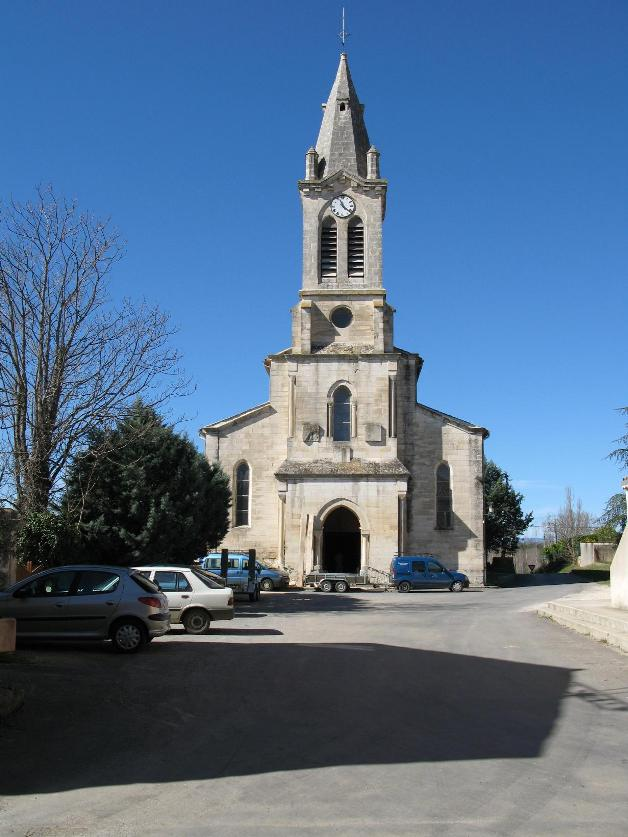
- The church in Vagnas
- Location of Vagnas
- Location within France Location within Auvergne-Rhône-Alpes
- Coordinates: 44°20′48″N 4°22′04″E
- Country: France
- Region: Auvergne-Rhône-Alpes
- Department: Ardèche
- Arrondissement: Largentière
- Canton: Vallon-Pont-d'Arc

Government
  - Mayor (2020–2026): Monique Mularoni
- Area^{1}: 23.83 km^{2} (9.20 sq mi)
- Elevation: 230 m (750 ft)
- Highest elevation: 550 m (1,800 ft)
- Lowest elevation: 151 m (495 ft)
- Population (2023): 636
  - Density: 26.7/km^{2} (69.1/sq mi)
- Time zone: UTC+01:00 (CET)
  - Summer (DST): UTC+02:00 (CEST)
- INSEE/Postal code: 07328 /07150
- ^{1} French Land Register data, which excludes lakes, ponds, glaciers > 1 km^{2} (0.386 sq mi or 247 acres) and river estuaries.

Vagnas is a commune in the Ardèche department in southern France.

== Population ==
Historical population
Year	Pop.	±% p.a.
1968	298	—
1975	332	+1.56%
1982	412	+3.13%
1990	383	−0.91%
1999	430	+1.29%
2007	520	+2.40%
2012	557	+1.38%
2017	544	−0.47%
2023	636	+2.64%
Source: INSEE

== See also ==
- Communes of the Ardèche department
