= Chazeaux =

- Commune
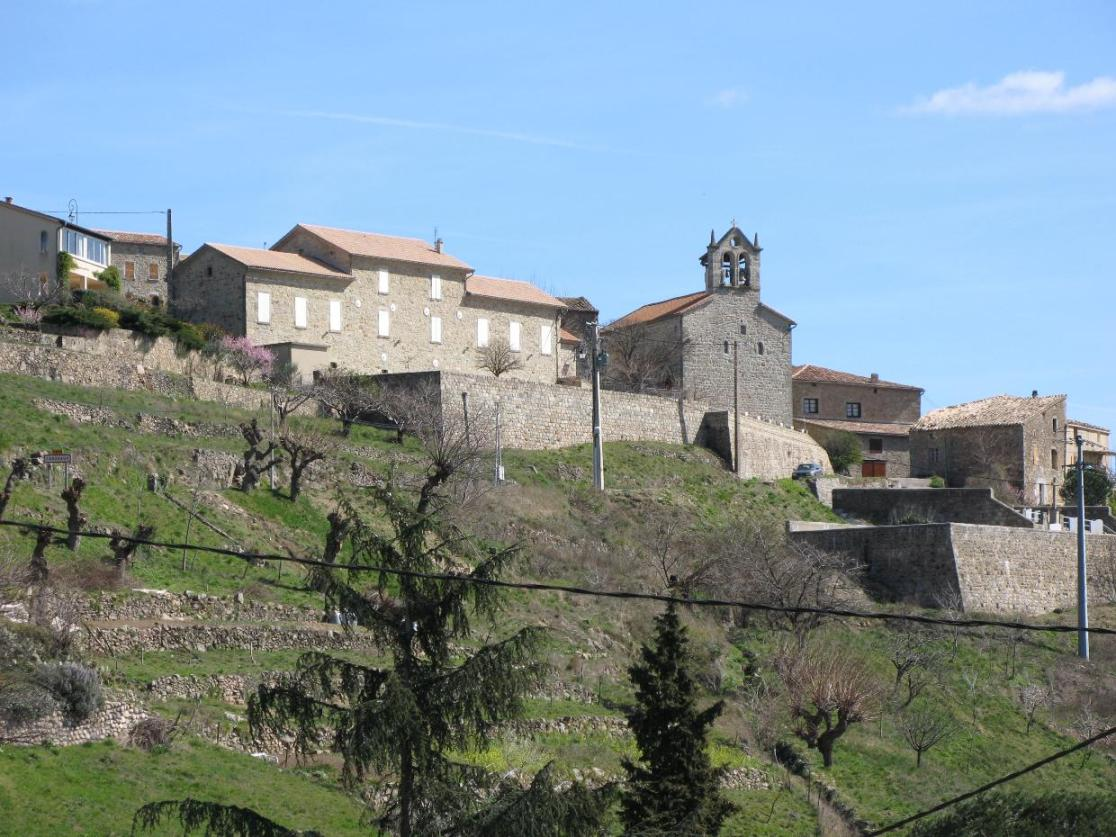
- The church and surrounding buildings in Chazeaux
- Location of Chazeaux
- Location within France Location within Auvergne-Rhône-Alpes
- Coordinates: 44°35′44″N 4°18′25″E
- Country: France
- Region: Auvergne-Rhône-Alpes
- Department: Ardèche
- Arrondissement: Largentière
- Canton: Vallon-Pont-d'Arc
- Intercommunality: Val de Ligne

Government
  - Mayor (2020–2026): Gilles Grattepanche
- Area^{1}: 4.62 km^{2} (1.78 sq mi)
- Elevation: 470 m (1,540 ft)
- Highest elevation: 830 m (2,720 ft)
- Lowest elevation: 289 m (948 ft)
- Population (2023): 134
  - Density: 29.0/km^{2} (75.1/sq mi)
- Time zone: UTC+01:00 (CET)
  - Summer (DST): UTC+02:00 (CEST)
- INSEE/Postal code: 07062 /07110
- ^{1} French Land Register data, which excludes lakes, ponds, glaciers > 1 km^{2} (0.386 sq mi or 247 acres) and river estuaries.

Chazeaux (French pronunciation: [ʃazo]; Occitan: Chasaus) is a commune in the Ardèche department in southern France.

== Population ==
Historical population
Year	Pop.	±% p.a.
1968	166	—
1975	114	−5.23%
1982	124	+1.21%
1990	86	−4.47%
1999	103	+2.02%
2007	104	+0.12%
2012	109	+0.94%
2017	139	+4.98%
2023	134	−0.61%
Source: INSEE

== See also ==
- Communes of the Ardèche department
