= Canton of Vallon-Pont-d'Arc =

Canton of France

Coordinates: 44.41°N 4.39°E

- Canton
- Situation of the canton of Vallon-Pont-d'Arc in the department of Ardèche
- Country: France
- Region: Auvergne-Rhône-Alpes
- Department: Ardèche
- No. of communes: {{{nbcomm}}}
- Population (2023): 21,367
- INSEE code: 0715

The canton of Vallon-Pont-d'Arc (French: Canton de Vallon-Pont-d'Arc) is an administrative division of the Ardèche department, southern France. Its borders were modified at the canton reorganisation that came into effect in March 2015. Its seat is Vallon-Pont-d'Arc.

== List of communes ==
It consists of the following communes:

1. Balazuc
2. Bessas
3. Chassiers
4. Chauzon
5. Chazeaux
6. Grospierres
7. Joannas
8. Labastide-de-Virac
9. Labeaume
10. Lagorce
11. Largentière
12. Laurac-en-Vivarais
13. Montréal
14. Orgnac-l'Aven
15. Pradons
16. Prunet
17. Rochecolombe
18. Rocher
19. Ruoms
20. Saint-Alban-Auriolles
21. Saint-Maurice-d'Ardèche
22. Saint-Remèze
23. Salavas
24. Sampzon
25. Sanilhac
26. Tauriers
27. Uzer
28. Vagnas
29. Vallon-Pont-d'Arc
30. Vogüé
