= Pradons =

- Commune
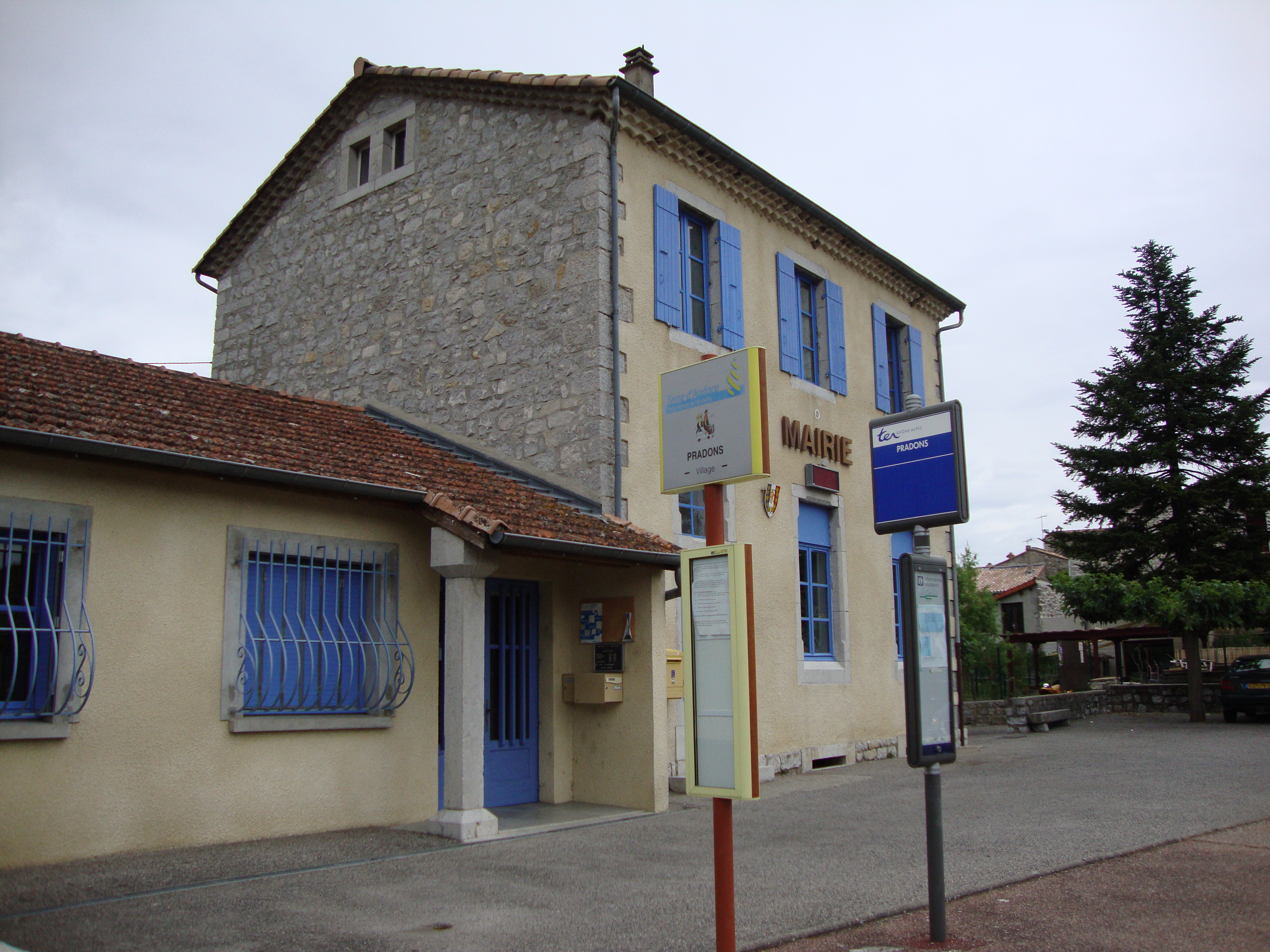
- The town hall in Pradons
- Location of Pradons
- Location within France Location within Auvergne-Rhône-Alpes
- Coordinates: 44°28′32″N 4°21′34″E
- Country: France
- Region: Auvergne-Rhône-Alpes
- Department: Ardèche
- Arrondissement: Largentière
- Canton: Vallon-Pont-d'Arc

Government
  - Mayor (2020–2026): Yves Rieu
- Area^{1}: 7.98 km^{2} (3.08 sq mi)
- Elevation: 130 m (430 ft)
- Highest elevation: 365 m (1,198 ft)
- Lowest elevation: 108 m (354 ft)
- Population (2023): 545
  - Density: 68.3/km^{2} (177/sq mi)
- Time zone: UTC+01:00 (CET)
  - Summer (DST): UTC+02:00 (CEST)
- INSEE/Postal code: 07183 /07120
- ^{1} French Land Register data, which excludes lakes, ponds, glaciers > 1 km^{2} (0.386 sq mi or 247 acres) and river estuaries.

Pradons (French pronunciation: [pʁadɔ̃]) is a commune in the Ardèche department in southern France.

== Population ==
Historical population
Year	Pop.	±% p.a.
1968	143	—
1975	152	+0.88%
1982	180	+2.44%
1990	220	+2.54%
1999	295	+3.31%
2007	412	+4.26%
2012	446	+1.60%
2017	470	+1.05%
2023	545	+2.50%
Source: INSEE

== See also ==
- Communes of the Ardèche department
