= Uzer, Ardèche =

Uzer
- Commune
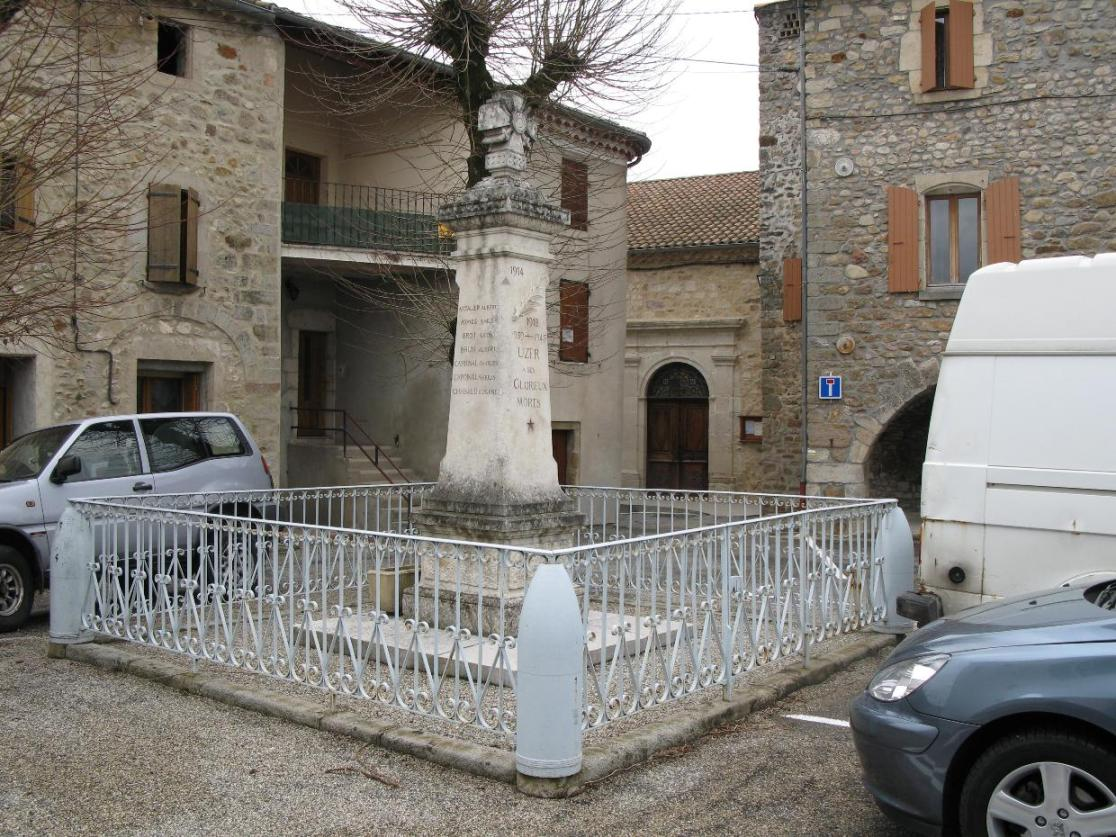
- The war memorial in Uzer
- Location of Uzer
- Location within France Location within Auvergne-Rhône-Alpes
- Coordinates: 44°31′12″N 4°19′38″E
- Country: France
- Region: Auvergne-Rhône-Alpes
- Department: Ardèche
- Arrondissement: Largentière
- Canton: Vallon-Pont-d'Arc
- Intercommunality: Val de Ligne

Government
  - Mayor (2020–2026): Yves Aubert
- Area^{1}: 3.51 km^{2} (1.36 sq mi)
- Elevation: 146 m (479 ft)
- Highest elevation: 335 m (1,099 ft)
- Lowest elevation: 130 m (430 ft)
- Population (2023): 421
  - Density: 120/km^{2} (311/sq mi)
- Time zone: UTC+01:00 (CET)
  - Summer (DST): UTC+02:00 (CEST)
- INSEE/Postal code: 07327 /07110
- ^{1} French Land Register data, which excludes lakes, ponds, glaciers > 1 km^{2} (0.386 sq mi or 247 acres) and river estuaries.

Uzer (French pronunciation: [yzɛʁ]; Occitan: Usèr) is a commune in the Ardèche department in southern France.

== Population ==
Historical population
Year	Pop.	±% p.a.
1968	274	—
1975	305	+1.54%
1982	337	+1.44%
1990	368	+1.11%
1999	336	−1.01%
2007	393	+1.98%
2012	444	+2.47%
2017	414	−1.39%
2023	421	+0.28%
Source: INSEE

== See also ==
- Communes of the Ardèche department
