= March from Antioch to Jerusalem during the First Crusade =

Military offensive in 1099

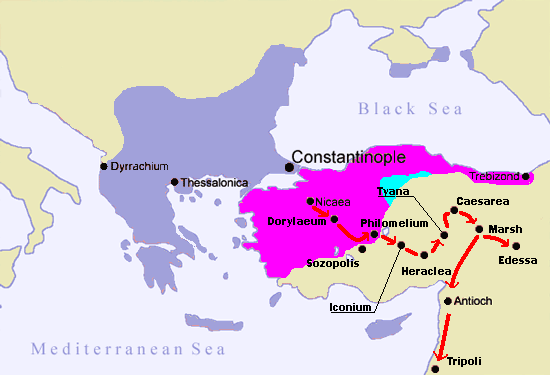
Route of the First Crusade through Asia

The First Crusade march down the Mediterranean coast from recently taken Antioch to Jerusalem started on 13 January 1099. During the march the Crusaders encountered little resistance, as local rulers preferred to make peace with them and furnish them with supplies rather than fight, with a notable exception of the aborted siege of Arqa. On 7 June, the Crusaders reached Jerusalem, which had been recaptured from the Seljuks by the Fatimids only the year before.

== Background ==
After the successful Siege of Antioch in June 1098, the Crusaders remained in the area for the rest of the year. The papal legate Adhemar of Le Puy had died, and Bohemund of Taranto had claimed Antioch for himself. Baldwin of Boulogne remained in Edessa, captured earlier in 1098. There was dissent among the princes regarding what to do next. Raymond of Toulouse, frustrated, left Antioch and captured the fortress of Maarat. By the end of the year the minor knights and infantry were threatening to march to Jerusalem without the princes.

== March to Jerusalem ==
At the end of December 1098 or early in January 1099, Robert of Normandy and Bohemond's nephew Tancred agreed to become vassals of Raymond, who was wealthy enough to compensate them for their service. Godfrey of Bouillon, however, who had revenue from his brother's territories in Edessa, refused to do the same. On 5 January, Raymond dismantled the walls of Maarat. On 13 January he began the march south to Jerusalem, barefoot and dressed as a pilgrim, followed by Robert and Tancred and their respective armies. Proceeding south along the coast, they encountered little resistance.

Raymond planned to take Tripoli for himself to set up a state equivalent to Bohemond's Antioch. First however, he besieged nearby Arqa. Meanwhile, Godfrey, along with Robert of Flanders, who had also refused vassalage to Raymond, joined with the remaining Crusaders at Latakia and marched south in February. Bohemond had originally marched out with them but quickly returned to Antioch in order to consolidate his rule against the advancing Byzantines. At this time, Tancred left Raymond's service and joined with Godfrey, due to some unknown quarrel. Another separate force, though linked to Godfrey's, was led by Gaston IV of Béarn.

Godfrey, Robert, Tancred, and Gaston arrived at Arqa in March, but the siege continued. Pons of Balazun died, struck by a stone missile. The situation was tense not only among the military leaders, but also among the clergy. Since Adhemar's death there had been no real leader of the crusade, and ever since the discovery of the Holy Lance by Peter Bartholomew in Antioch, there had been accusations of fraud among the clerical factions. Finally, in April, Arnulf of Chocques challenged Peter to an ordeal by fire. Peter underwent the ordeal and died after days of agony from his wounds, which discredited the Holy Lance as a fake. This also undermined Raymond's authority over the crusade, as he was the main proponent of its authenticity.

The siege of Arqa lasted until 13 May, when the Crusaders left having captured nothing. The Fatimids, the Egyptians who ruled over Jerusalem, had attempted to make a deal with the Crusaders, promising freedom of passage to any pilgrims to the Holy Land on the condition that the Crusaders not advance into their domains, but this deal was rejected. Iftikhar ad-Daula, the Fatimid governor of Jerusalem, was aware of the Crusaders' intentions. Therefore, he expelled all of Jerusalem's Christian inhabitants. He also poisoned most of the wells in the area. On 13 May the Crusaders came to Tripoli, where the Emir there, Jalal al-Mulk Abu'l Hasan, provided the Crusader army with horses. According to the anonymous chronicle Gesta Francorum, he also vowed to convert to Christianity if the Crusaders defeated the Fatimids. Continuing south along the coast, the Crusaders passed Beirut on 19 May and Tyre on 23 May. Turning inland at Jaffa, on 3 June they reached Ramlah, which had been abandoned by its inhabitants. The bishopric of Ramlah-Lydda was established there at the church of St. George (a popular crusader hero) before they continued on to Jerusalem. On 6 June, Godfrey sent Tancred and Gaston to capture Bethlehem, where Tancred flew his banner over the Church of the Nativity.

On 7 June, the Crusaders reached Jerusalem and besieged the city.
