= Chassiers =

- Commune
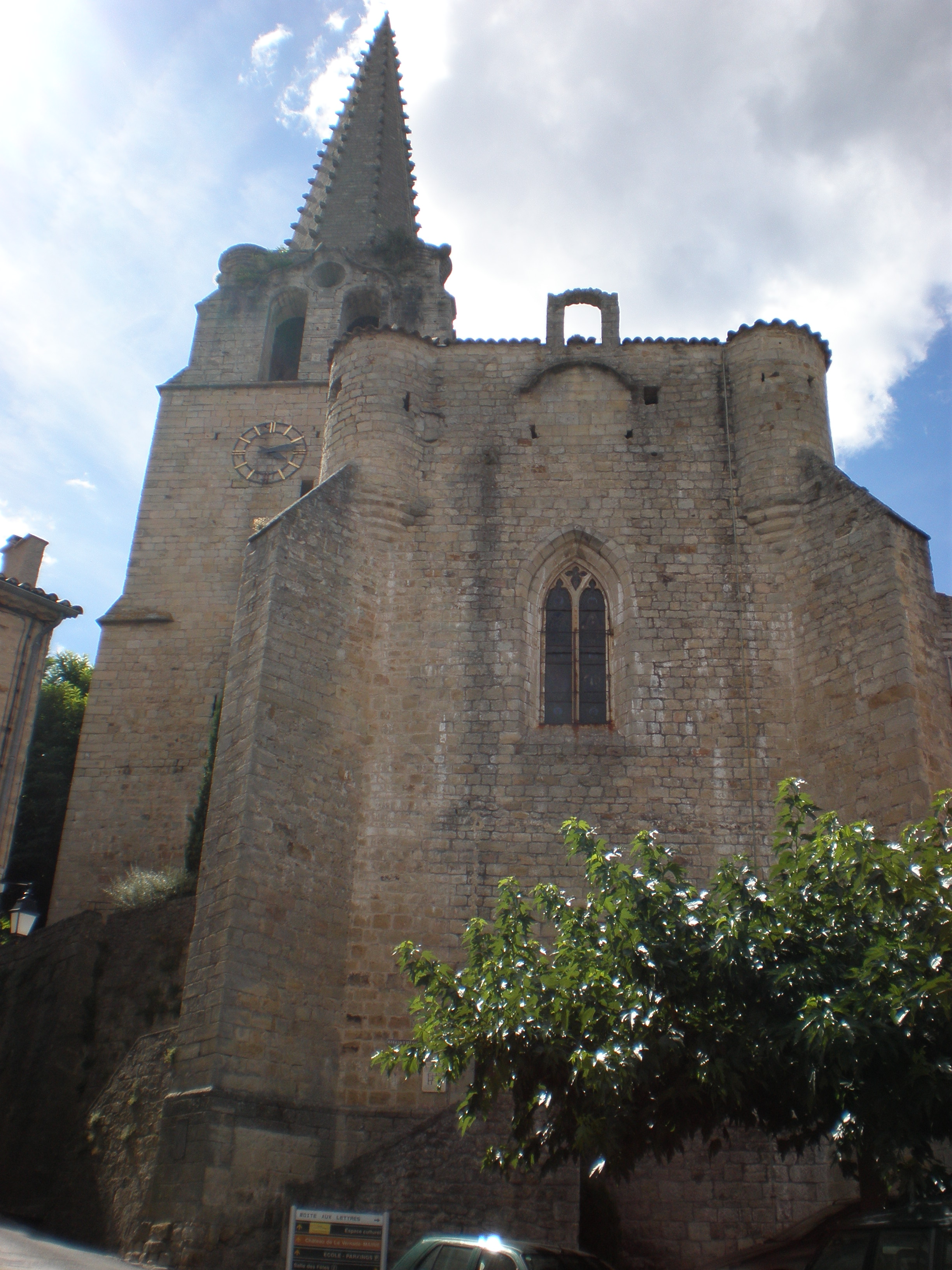
- The fortress church in Chassiers
- Location of Chassiers
- Location within France Location within Auvergne-Rhône-Alpes
- Coordinates: 44°33′05″N 4°17′50″E
- Country: France
- Region: Auvergne-Rhône-Alpes
- Department: Ardèche
- Arrondissement: Largentière
- Canton: Vallon-Pont-d'Arc
- Intercommunality: Val de Ligne

Government
  - Mayor (2020–2026): Hélène Mouterde
- Area^{1}: 12.26 km^{2} (4.73 sq mi)
- Highest elevation: 603 m (1,978 ft)
- Lowest elevation: 193 m (633 ft)
- Population (2023): 989
  - Density: 80.7/km^{2} (209/sq mi)
- Time zone: UTC+01:00 (CET)
  - Summer (DST): UTC+02:00 (CEST)
- INSEE/Postal code: 07058 /07110
- ^{1} French Land Register data, which excludes lakes, ponds, glaciers > 1 km^{2} (0.386 sq mi or 247 acres) and river estuaries.

Chassiers (French pronunciation: [ʃasje]) is a commune in the Ardèche department in southern France.

== See also ==
- Communes of the Ardèche department
