= Largentière =

Largentière L'Argentièira (Occitan)
- Subprefecture and commune
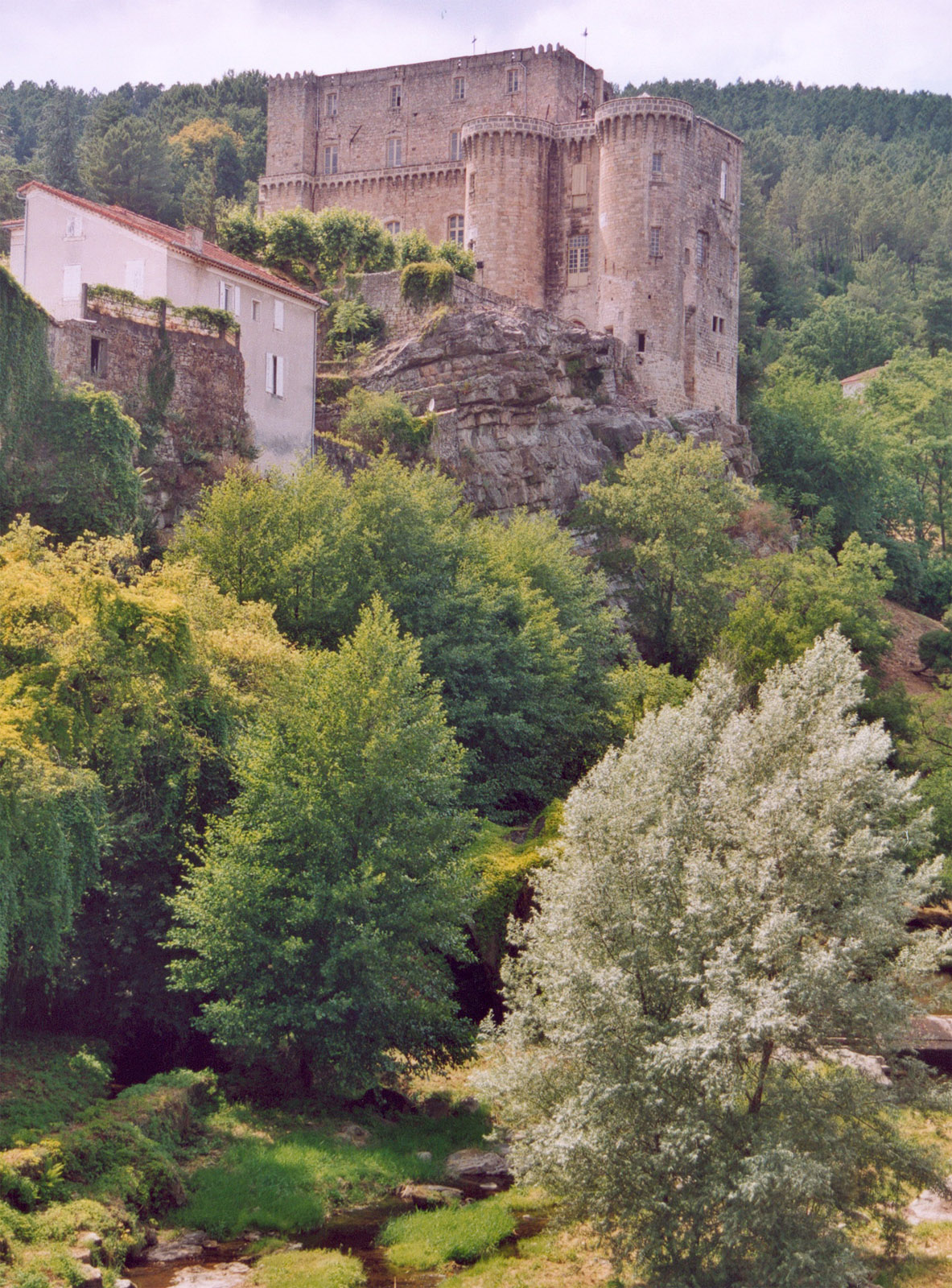
- The castle in Largentière

- Coat of arms
- Location of Largentière
- Location within France Location within Auvergne-Rhône-Alpes
- Coordinates: 44°32′37″N 4°17′39″E
- Country: France
- Region: Auvergne-Rhône-Alpes
- Department: Ardèche
- Arrondissement: Largentière
- Canton: Vallon-Pont-d'Arc
- Intercommunality: CC Val de Ligne

Government
  - Mayor (2020–2026): Jean-Roger Durand
- Area^{1}: 7.22 km^{2} (2.79 sq mi)
- Highest elevation: 420 m (1,380 ft)
- Lowest elevation: 147 m (482 ft)
- Population (2023): 1,450
  - Density: 201/km^{2} (520/sq mi)
- Demonym: Largentiérois
- Time zone: UTC+01:00 (CET)
  - Summer (DST): UTC+02:00 (CEST)
- INSEE/Postal code: 07132 /07710
- Website: www.largentiere.fr
- ^{1} French Land Register data, which excludes lakes, ponds, glaciers > 1 km^{2} (0.386 sq mi or 247 acres) and river estuaries.

Largentière (French pronunciation: [laʁʒɑ̃tjɛʁ]; Occitan: L'Argentièira) is a subprefecture and commune of the Ardèche department in the Auvergne-Rhône-Alpes region in Southern France.

It is located in the narrow valley of the Ligne, approximately 10 km (6.2 mi) southwest of Aubenas. With a population of 1,450 as of 2023, Largentière is the least populated subprefecture in France.

Its name, adopted in the 13th century in place of its more ancient name Segualeriae (Ségualières), refers to the silver mines in the area between the 10th and 15th centuries, when the silver-bearing lead ores in intrusive veins in the Largentières sandstone were exploited under the authority of the Counts of Toulouse and the Bishops of Viviers, whose title Barons de Largentière was linked to the bishopric.

== Demographics ==
Historical population
Year	Pop.	±% p.a.
1968	2,888	—
1975	2,671	−1.11%
1982	2,373	−1.68%
1990	1,990	−2.18%
1999	1,942	−0.27%
2007	1,820	−0.81%
2012	1,789	−0.34%
2017	1,629	−1.86%
2023	1,450	−1.92%
Source: INSEE

== Economy and transportation ==
A busy industrial town in the nineteenth century, when it housed silk mills, its principal industry is now tourism. Its only railroad station was demolished in 1982, leaving the town accessible only by road.

== Sights ==
Besides its twelfth- to fifteenth-century château, the town conserves its thirteenth-century church, Nôtre-Dame-des-Pommiers, its Renaissance hôtel de ville, its palais de justice, and the Tour Argentière that collected the mines' produce for guarded transport.

== Personalities ==
- Joseph ben Abba Mari ben Joseph ben Jacob Caspi (1279—1340), a prominent Jewish medieval philosopher.

== See also ==
- Communes of the Ardèche department
