= Lavillatte =

- Commune
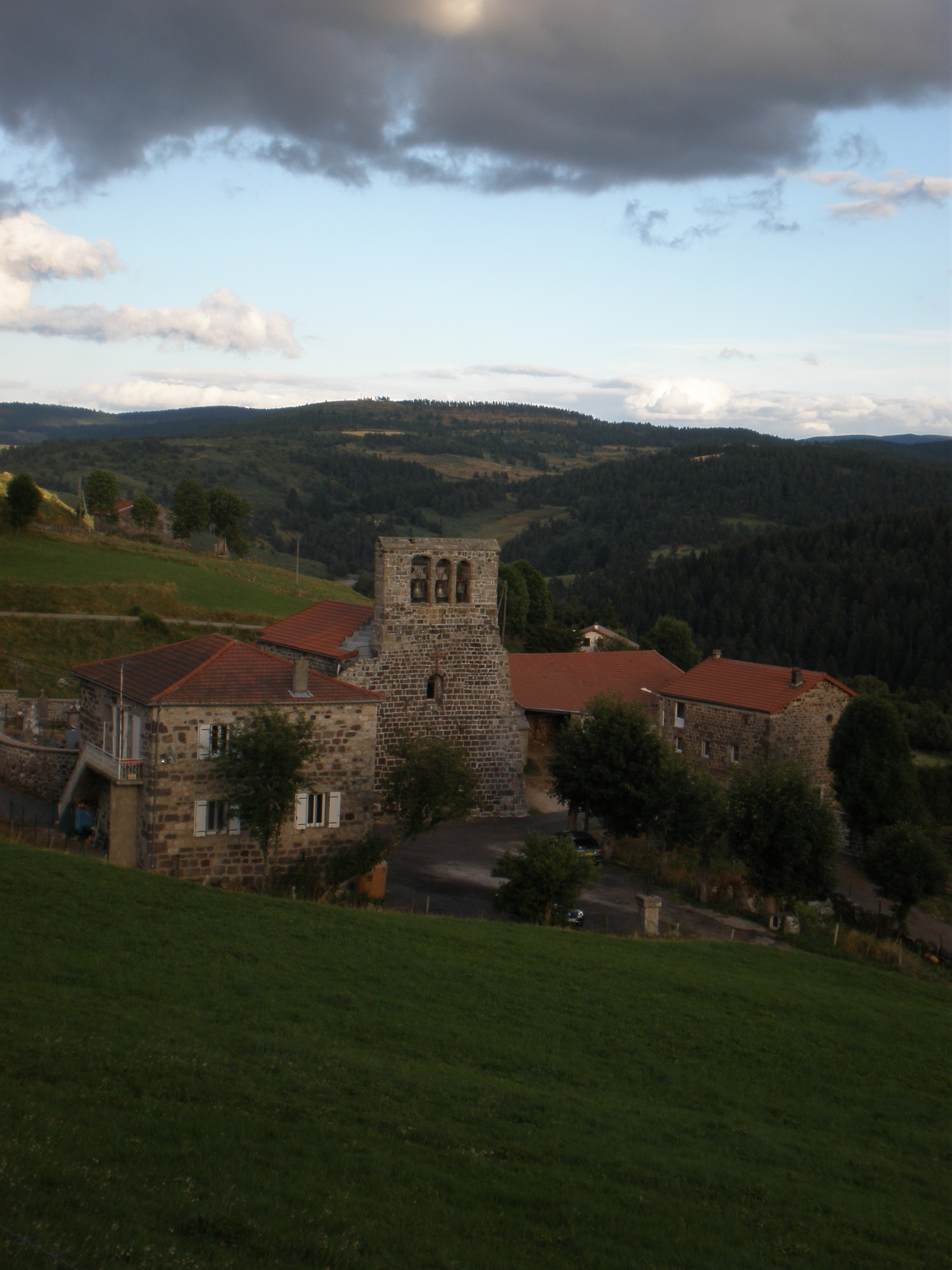
- The church and surrounding buildings in Lavillatte
- Location of Lavillatte
- Location within France Location within Auvergne-Rhône-Alpes
- Coordinates: 44°44′42″N 3°57′12″E
- Country: France
- Region: Auvergne-Rhône-Alpes
- Department: Ardèche
- Arrondissement: Largentière
- Canton: Haute-Ardèche

Government
  - Mayor (2020–2026): Marylaine Mercier
- Area^{1}: 18.6 km^{2} (7.2 sq mi)
- Elevation: 1,140 m (3,740 ft)
- Highest elevation: 1,405 m (4,610 ft)
- Lowest elevation: 1,060 m (3,480 ft)
- Population (2023): 44
  - Density: 2.4/km^{2} (6.1/sq mi)
- Time zone: UTC+01:00 (CET)
  - Summer (DST): UTC+02:00 (CEST)
- INSEE/Postal code: 07137 /07660
- ^{1} French Land Register data, which excludes lakes, ponds, glaciers > 1 km^{2} (0.386 sq mi or 247 acres) and river estuaries.

Lavillatte (French pronunciation: [lavilat]; Occitan: La Vilata) is a commune in the Ardèche department in southern France. It is in the Auvergne-Rhône-Alpes region.

Inhabitants are known as Viallatins and Viallatines.

== Geography ==
=== Location and description ===
Lavillatte is 15 kilometers from Langogne, 40 kilometers from Le Puy-en-Velay, and 50 kilometeres from Aubenas. It is included in the canton of Coucouron, the Arrondissement of Largentière, and the department of Ardèche. The municipality has 1,860 hectares, including 660 hectares of forest.

=== Bordering communes ===
- Saint-Paul-de-Tartas (Haute-Loire)
- Coucouron
- Issanlas
- Lespéron
- Lanarce
- Saint-Alban-en-Montagne
- Le Plagnal
- Astet

=== Climate ===
In 2010, the French National Centre for Scientific Research concluded that the commune had a mountain climate. Météo-France's 2020 typology of French climates concluded that Lavillatte is exposesd to a mountain or mountain margin climate, and is situated in the South East of Massif Central climatic region. This region is characterized by annual rainfall of 1,000 to 1,500 mm, minimal in the summer and heaviest in the fall.

== Population ==
Historical population
Year	Pop.	±% p.a.
1968	134	—
1975	103	−3.69%
1982	101	−0.28%
1990	98	−0.38%
1999	87	−1.31%
2007	78	−1.36%
2012	78	+0.00%
2017	57	−6.08%
2023	44	−4.22%
Source: INSEE

== See also ==
- Communes of the Ardèche department
