= Le Béage =

- Commune
- Location of Le Béage
- Location within France Location within Auvergne-Rhône-Alpes
- Coordinates: 44°51′00″N 4°07′11″E
- Country: France
- Region: Auvergne-Rhône-Alpes
- Department: Ardèche
- Arrondissement: Largentière
- Canton: Haute-Ardèche

Government
  - Mayor (2020–2026): Claude Brun
- Area^{1}: 32.83 km^{2} (12.68 sq mi)
- Elevation: 1,200 m (3,900 ft)
- Highest elevation: 1,602 m (5,256 ft)
- Lowest elevation: 960 m (3,150 ft)
- Population (2023): 254
  - Density: 7.74/km^{2} (20.0/sq mi)
- Time zone: UTC+01:00 (CET)
  - Summer (DST): UTC+02:00 (CEST)
- INSEE/Postal code: 07026 /07630
- ^{1} French Land Register data, which excludes lakes, ponds, glaciers > 1 km^{2} (0.386 sq mi or 247 acres) and river estuaries.

Le Béage (French pronunciation: [lə beaʒ]; Occitan: Lo Biatge) is a commune in the Ardèche department in the Auvergne-Rhône-Alpes region of southern France.

The inhabitants of the commune are known as Béageais or Béageaises.

== Geography ==
Le Béage is located some 30 km south-east of Le Puy-en-Velay and 30 km north-west of Aubenas. The northern border of the commune is the departmental border with Haute-Loire. Access to the commune is by the D16 road from Le Lac-d'Issarlès in the south-west which goes to the village. The D122 comes from Sainte-Eulalie in the south-east which passes through the village and continues north-west, changing to the D535 at the departmental border, and continuing to Freycenet-la-Cuche. The D302 goes south to Cros-de-Géorand while the D377 goes north-east changing to the D378A in the commune then to the D36 at the departmental border and continues to Les Estables in the north. The D378 branches from the D377 in the north of the commune and goes to Borée in the north-east. Apart from the village there are the hamlets of Mazaboulet, Beauregard, Chanalettes, and Touzieres. The commune has large forests with farmland.

The Veyradeyre rises in the north-east of the commune and flows west then south-west through the commune gathering many tributaries in the commune as it continues south to join the Loire west of Le Lac-d'Issarles. The Gage river rises in the east of the commune and flows south forming most of the eastern border then continues to join the Tauron south of the commune. The Orcival forms part of the northern border as it flows west, forming the departmental border, to join the Loire west of Issarlès.

== Toponymy ==
Le Béage appears as le Beage on the 1750 Cassini Map and the same on the 1790 version.

== History ==
The origins and name of the commune appear to be linked to the old road that passes through it. Montpezat-sous-Bauzon in Monastier has a very old road coming from the Rhone valley called Chemin du Pal. Julius Caesar would have passed near the village (or even through) on his way to face the Arverni with his legions. He would have been forced to make a great effort to shift the snow that was blocking him. Located at a halfway point, Le Béage experienced a renowned trade because this village was a relay point for mules and other carters who were halfway to Puy-en-Velay. There were many inns. After the French Revolution royalists were still very numerous in the area and troops from Puy-en-Velay came to reinforce the local forces to maintain order.

Many fairs and markets drew large crowds to Le Béage where most inhabitants were at the same time farmers, traders, freight carriers, and often owners of public houses. There were still more than 30 in the 1940s. In the 1830s the population was about 2400 inhabitants which dropped to 1550 by the 1900s and the number of inhabitants is now 285. This trade suggests that the origins of Le Béage date far back in time as for some names: "Chazales", de Casa, Casals. The houses: "Crouste", caves, underground houses, and "Chabanis" for huts bear witness to ancient settlements. It was certainly the grouping of inhabitants at a crossroads that gave birth to the village of Le Béage.

The etymology and origins of Béage come from French Le Béage or Lou Biadge in the local dialect. The current name "Le Béage" dates back to the French Revolution, in the 1790s, a time when Le Béage was created as a commune. There are several hypotheses on the origin of the name: it may have simply come from Le Péage (The Toll) but the most probable hypothesis refers to the ancient road that divides the interior of the village and Le Béage "Bizadge" (old dialect) or "Lou biadgé" (recent dialect) would mean a village with two paths which agrees quite well with the ancient trade Béage. The village is also known as the Bisatico and Bidagiis (Latin).

The 2000s have seen the construction of housing estates, a community hall, and a fire station. The old village was also repaved. According to Regis Sahuc the village is also called "Arvermaténia" which would have meant "door of the Auvergne" or "Arverni", the Gallic tribes inhabiting the Auvergne.

== Administration ==
List of Successive Mayors

Mayors from the French Revolution to 1929

From	To	Name
1801	1801	Antoine Théofrède Chouvet
1801	1802	Jean Louis Gimbert
1802	1825	Antoine Saugues
1825	1828	François Talobre
1828	1830	Jean Louis Ollier
1830	1834	Jean Jacques Gimbert
1834	1836	Louis Testud
1836	1854	Jean Louis Ollier
1854	1860	Jean Antoine Souteyran
1870	1871	Adolphe Lourdin
1871	1879	Cyprien Souteyran
1880	1886	Rosières Saugues
1886	1888	Jean Louis Petit
1888	1889	Cyprien Souteyran
1889	1901	Cyprien, Clovis, Amédée, Léonard Souteyran
1901	1902	Pierre Teyssier
1902	1929	Cyprien, Clovis, Amédée, Léonard Souteyran

Mayors from 1959

From	To	Name
1959	1971	Edmond Jalade
1971	1989	Marcel Gardes
1989	1995	Jean Lavastre
1995	2020	Jean-Marie Redon
2020	current	Claude Brun

== Demography ==
Historical population

Year	Pop.	±% p.a.
1793	1,280	—
1800	1,338	+0.64%
1806	1,369	+0.38%
1821	1,618	+1.12%
1831	2,406	+4.05%
1836	1,794	−5.70%
1841	1,731	−0.71%
1846	1,752	+0.24%
1851	1,756	+0.05%
1856	1,712	−0.51%
1861	1,743	+0.36%
1866	1,725	−0.21%
1872	1,614	−1.10%
1876	1,648	+0.52%
1881	1,602	−0.56%
1886	1,575	−0.34%
1891	1,512	−0.81%
1896	1,530	+0.24%
1901	1,562	+0.41%

Year	Pop.	±% p.a.
1906	1,530	−0.41%
1911	1,408	−1.65%
1921	1,302	−0.78%
1926	1,201	−1.60%
1931	1,131	−1.19%
1936	1,056	−1.36%
1946	928	−1.28%
1954	827	−1.43%
1962	671	−2.58%
1968	640	−0.79%
1975	531	−2.63%
1982	436	−2.78%
1990	352	−2.64%
1999	337	−0.48%
2007	328	−0.34%
2012	285	−2.77%
2017	255	−2.20%
2023	254	−0.07%

Source: EHESS and INSEE

=== Education ===
The commune has a public primary school.

== Culture and heritage ==
=== Civil heritage ===
- The Chartreuse de Bonnefoy ruins reveal the "high house" and "low house".
- The Chastelas Chateau ruins

=== Religious heritage ===
- The Presbytery contains a number of items that are registered as historical objects:
  - A Reliquary of Saint John Francis Regis (1884)
  - A Monstrance (19th century)
  - A Statue: The Virgin (19th century)
  - A Processional Cross (19th century)
  - A Statue: Saint John Francis Regis (19th century)
- The Church of Saint Peter contains a number of items that are registered as historical objects:
  - A Processional Cross (16th century)
  - A Bronze Bell (1661)
  - A Window representing Saint John Francis Regis (19th century)
  - An Altar: The Virgin (19th century)
  - An Altar: Saint John Francis Regis (19th century)
  - A Confessional (19th century)
  - A Statue with base: Saint Peter (19th century)
  - A Statue: Saint Joseph and child (19th century)
  - A Baptismal font (18th century)
  - A Canopied Altar (19th century)

=== Associations ===
- Festival Committee
- Association Sportive du Béage (Football, Senior team Drôme-Ardèche second division)
- Youth Committee of Béage
- Autumn Sun
- Association of Grands Plateaux

=== Events ===
- The Grasse Fair (Grass-Fed Cattle Competition) takes place every year, three weeks before Easter.
- The Maôche Evening (traditional specialty: Pork belly stuffed with cabbage and sausage meat) held every year on the weekend of 11 November.
- Garage sales are held each year on the last Saturday in July.
- The Village Festival of Béage are held annually on the last Sunday of July.
- The Salon 4x4 Béage is held every year on the last weekend in May.

=== Culinary specialties ===
- Maôche ("Maucha" in Occitan is pronounced [mauSo]), pork belly stuffed with sausage meat and cabbage and well cooked in water.
- Bombine is composed of potatoes with carrots, onions, bacon bits (or lamb or calf's foot ...) and flavoured with bay leaf.
- Pogne is a bun shaped like a crown made from flour, eggs, and butter and flavoured with orange blossom.
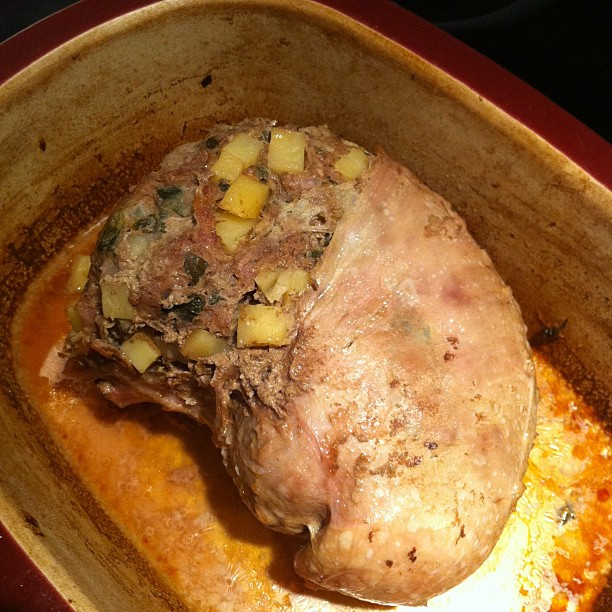
Maôche

== Notable people linked to the commune ==
- Captain Jean Antoine Souteyran (16 May 1785 - 27 April 1864, son of Victor Souteyran and Isabeau Giraud). An officer in Napoleon's army, first eagle carrier of the 64th infantry of the line in November 1813, Flag Lieutenant of the 60th Infantry Regiment on 9 August 1814, Knight of the Legion of Honour (1831), Saint Helena Medal (1857). Battle of Jena–Auerstedt, Prantzlow-Eylau, Battle of Friedland, Siege of Lleida (1810), Valencia-Terragone, Villafranca de Panades, Battle of Waterloo. Married to Rose Faure. Former mayor of Béage (1854-1860). His grave is visible today in the cemetery of Béage.
- 'Régis Breysse, born in Béage 19 July 1810, son of Jean Louis Breysse and Rose Chamard. He died at Bicetre on 1 July 1860. Sculptor. The sculptor David d'Angers opened the doors of his studio for him. School of Fine Arts. "Christ on the Cross" in the Aubenas church, "Boissy d'Anglas chairing the meeting of the 1st Prairial" in the Council audience room in the prefecture of Privas.
- Gérenton du Béage (Jarento de Bisatico), Lord of Béage died before the walls of Jerusalem during the Crusades.

== See also ==
- Communes of the Ardèche department
