= Saint-Cirgues =

Saint-Cirgues is the name or part of the name of several communes in France:

- Saint-Cirgues, Haute-Loire in the Haute-Loire department
- Saint-Cirgues, Lot in the Lot department
- Saint-Cirgues-de-Jordanne, in the Cantal department
- Saint-Cirgues-de-Malbert, in the Cantal department
- Saint-Cirgues-de-Prades, in the Ardèche department
- Saint-Cirgues-en-Montagne, in the Ardèche department
- Saint-Cirgues-la-Loutre, in the Corrèze department
- Saint-Cirgues-sur-Couze, in the Puy-de-Dôme department
- Saint-Cirgue, in the Tarn department
