= Arrondissement of Largentière =

Coordinates: 44°32′24″N 4°17′29″E

Largentière
- Arrondissement
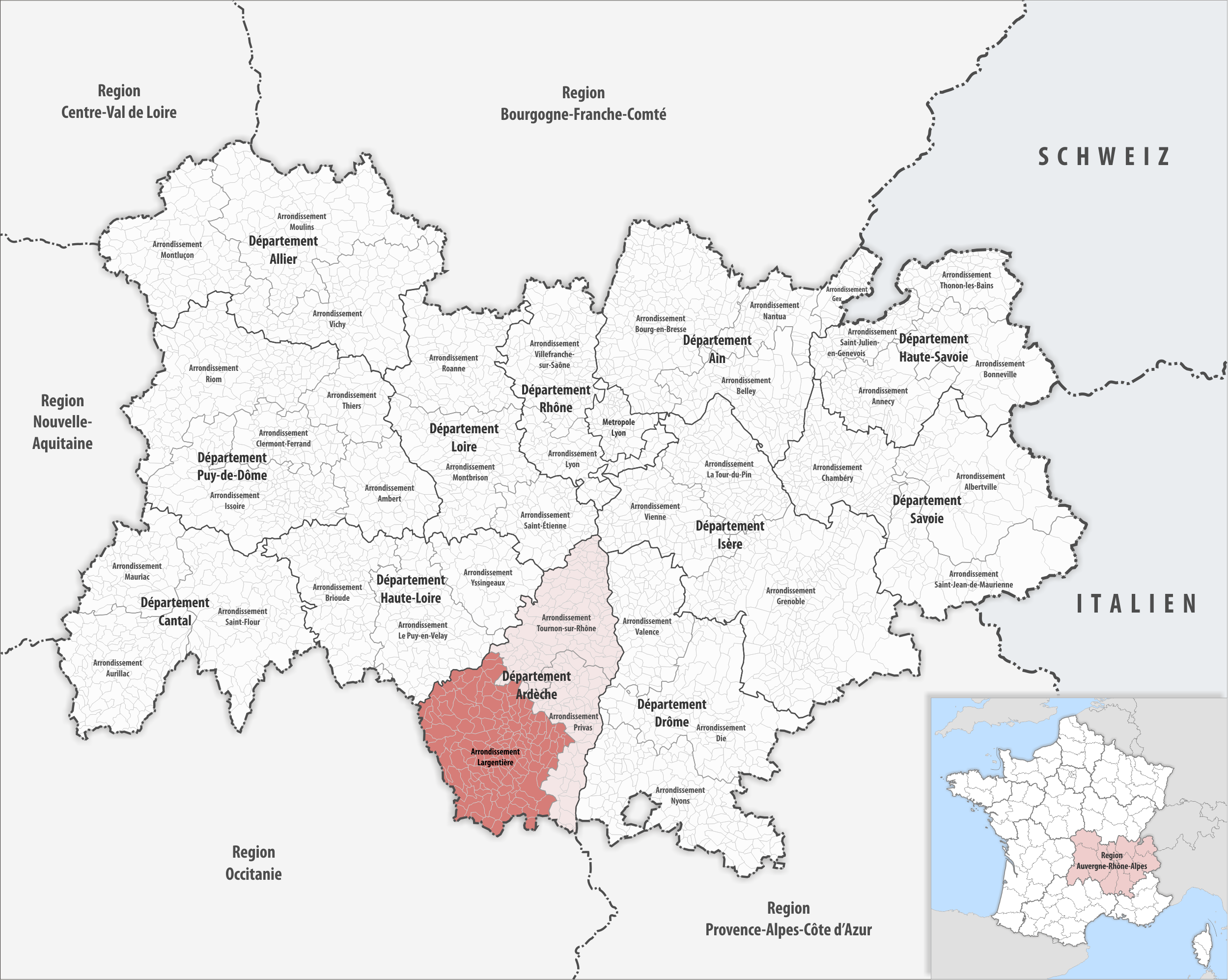
- Location within the region Auvergne-Rhône-Alpes
- Country: France
- Region: Auvergne-Rhône-Alpes
- Department: Ardèche
- No. of communes: {{{nbcomm}}}
- Area: 2,646.4 km^{2} (1,021.8 sq mi)
- Population (2023): 104,582
  - Density: 39.519/km^{2} (102.35/sq mi)
- INSEE code: 071

The arrondissement of Largentière is an arrondissement of France in the Ardèche department in the Auvergne-Rhône-Alpes region. It has 151 communes. Its population is 103,712 (2021), and its area is 2,646.4 km^{2} (1,021.8 sq mi).

== Composition ==
The communes of the arrondissement of Largentière are:

1. Ailhon
2. Aizac
3. Les Assions
4. Astet
5. Aubenas
6. Balazuc
7. Banne
8. Barnas
9. Le Béage
10. Beaulieu
11. Beaumont
12. Berrias-et-Casteljau
13. Berzème
14. Bessas
15. Borée
16. Borne
17. Burzet
18. Cellier-du-Luc
19. Chambonas
20. Chandolas
21. Chassiers
22. Chauzon
23. Chazeaux
24. Chirols
25. Coucouron
26. Cros-de-Géorand
27. Darbres
28. Dompnac
29. Fabras
30. Faugères
31. Fons
32. Genestelle
33. Gravières
34. Grospierres
35. Issanlas
36. Issarlès
37. Jaujac
38. Joannas
39. Joyeuse
40. Juvinas
41. Labastide-de-Virac
42. Labastide-sur-Bésorgues
43. Labeaume
44. Labégude
45. Lablachère
46. Laboule
47. Le Lac-d'Issarlès
48. Lachamp-Raphaël
49. Lachapelle-Graillouse
50. Lachapelle-sous-Aubenas
51. Lagorce
52. Lalevade-d'Ardèche
53. Lanarce
54. Lanas
55. Largentière
56. Laurac-en-Vivarais
57. Laveyrune
58. Lavillatte
59. Lavilledieu
60. Laviolle
61. Lentillères
62. Lespéron
63. Loubaresse
64. Lussas
65. Malarce-sur-la-Thines
66. Malbosc
67. Mayres
68. Mazan-l'Abbaye
69. Mercuer
70. Meyras
71. Mézilhac
72. Mirabel
73. Montpezat-sous-Bauzon
74. Montréal
75. Montselgues
76. Orgnac-l'Aven
77. Payzac
78. Péreyres
79. Le Plagnal
80. Planzolles
81. Pont-de-Labeaume
82. Prades
83. Pradons
84. Prunet
85. Ribes
86. Rochecolombe
87. Rocher
88. La Rochette
89. Rocles
90. Rosières
91. Le Roux
92. Ruoms
93. Sablières
94. Sagnes-et-Goudoulet
95. Saint-Alban-Auriolles
96. Saint-Alban-en-Montagne
97. Saint-Andéol-de-Berg
98. Saint-Andéol-de-Vals
99. Saint-André-de-Cruzières
100. Saint-André-Lachamp
101. Saint-Cirgues-de-Prades
102. Saint-Cirgues-en-Montagne
103. Saint-Didier-sous-Aubenas
104. Sainte-Eulalie
105. Sainte-Marguerite-Lafigère
106. Saint-Étienne-de-Boulogne
107. Saint-Étienne-de-Fontbellon
108. Saint-Étienne-de-Lugdarès
109. Saint-Genest-de-Beauzon
110. Saint-Germain
111. Saint-Gineys-en-Coiron
112. Saint-Jean-le-Centenier
113. Saint-Joseph-des-Bancs
114. Saint-Julien-du-Serre
115. Saint-Laurent-les-Bains-Laval-d'Aurelle
116. Saint-Laurent-sous-Coiron
117. Saint-Martial
118. Saint-Maurice-d'Ardèche
119. Saint-Maurice-d'Ibie
120. Saint-Mélany
121. Saint-Michel-de-Boulogne
122. Saint-Paul-le-Jeune
123. Saint-Pierre-de-Colombier
124. Saint-Pierre-Saint-Jean
125. Saint-Pons
126. Saint-Privat
127. Saint-Remèze
128. Saint-Sauveur-de-Cruzières
129. Saint-Sernin
130. Salavas
131. Les Salelles
132. Sampzon
133. Sanilhac
134. Sceautres
135. La Souche
136. Tauriers
137. Thueyts
138. Ucel
139. Usclades-et-Rieutord
140. Uzer
141. Vagnas
142. Valgorge
143. Vallées-d'Antraigues-Asperjoc
144. Vallon-Pont-d'Arc
145. Vals-les-Bains
146. Les Vans
147. Vernon
148. Vesseaux
149. Villeneuve-de-Berg
150. Vinezac
151. Vogüé

== History ==
The arrondissement of Largentière was created in 1800. In 2007 it was expanded with the four cantons of Antraigues-sur-Volane, Aubenas, Vals-les-Bains and Villeneuve-de-Berg from the arrondissement of Privas. At the January 2017 reorganization of the arrondissements of Ardèche, it gained two communes from the arrondissement of Privas and three communes from the arrondissement of Tournon-sur-Rhône.

As a result of the reorganisation of the cantons of France which came into effect in 2015, the borders of the cantons are no longer related to the borders of the arrondissements. The cantons of the arrondissement of Largentière were, as of January 2015:

1. Antraigues-sur-Volane
2. Aubenas
3. Burzet
4. Coucouron
5. Joyeuse
6. Largentière
7. Montpezat-sous-Bauzon
8. Saint-Étienne-de-Lugdarès
9. Thueyts
10. Valgorge
11. Vallon-Pont-d'Arc
12. Vals-les-Bains
13. Les Vans
14. Villeneuve-de-Berg
