= Barnas =

- Commune
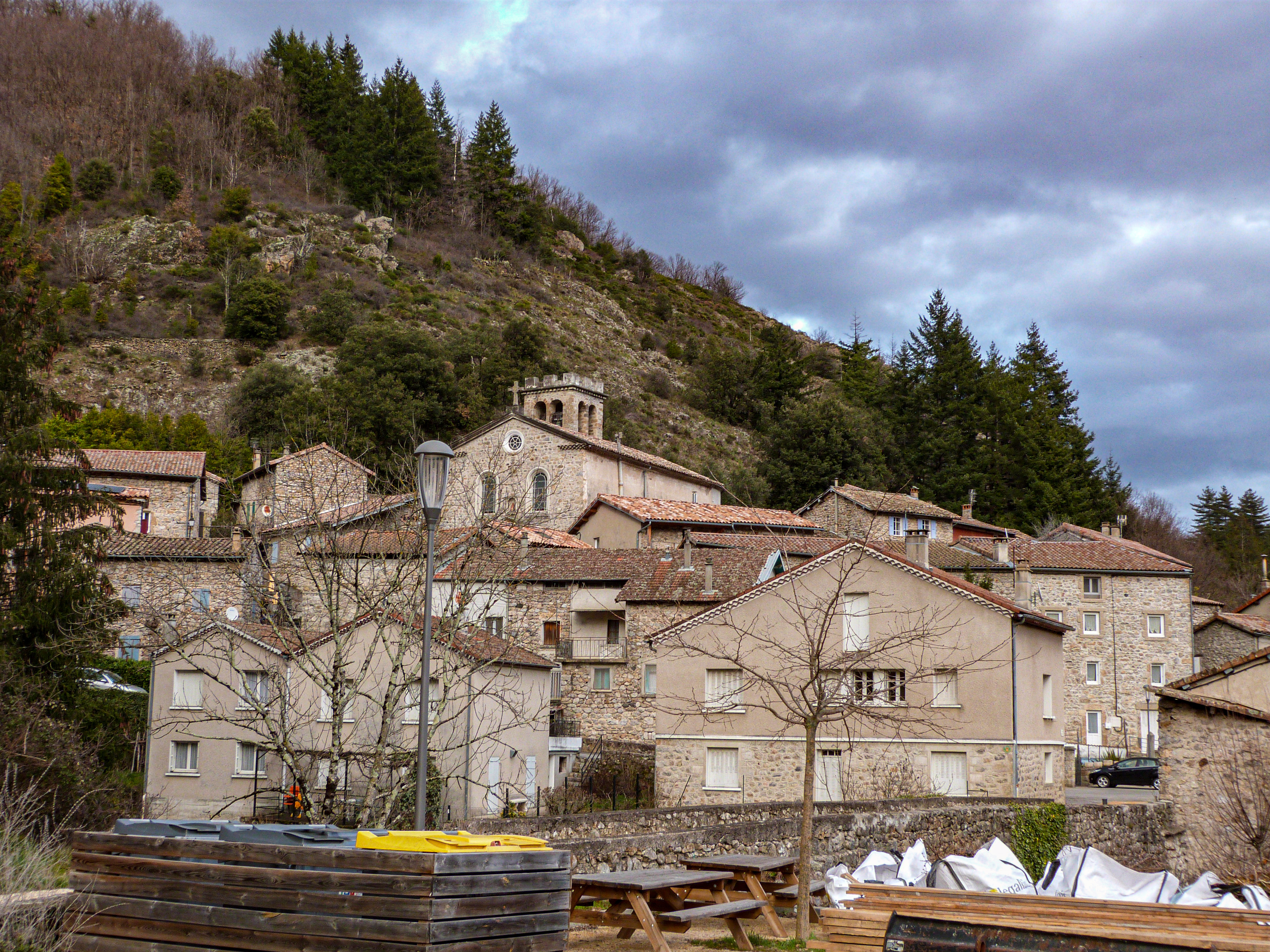

- Coat of arms
- Location of Barnas
- Location within France Location within Auvergne-Rhône-Alpes
- Coordinates: 44°40′07″N 4°10′14″E
- Country: France
- Region: Auvergne-Rhône-Alpes
- Department: Ardèche
- Arrondissement: Largentière
- Canton: Haute-Ardèche
- Intercommunality: Ardèche des Sources et Volcans

Government
  - Mayor (2023–2026): Lynda Bouet
- Area^{1}: 26.51 km^{2} (10.24 sq mi)
- Elevation: 464 m (1,522 ft)
- Highest elevation: 1,494 m (4,902 ft)
- Lowest elevation: 431 m (1,414 ft)
- Population (2023): 209
  - Density: 7.88/km^{2} (20.4/sq mi)
- Time zone: UTC+01:00 (CET)
  - Summer (DST): UTC+02:00 (CEST)
- INSEE/Postal code: 07025 /07330
- ^{1} French Land Register data, which excludes lakes, ponds, glaciers > 1 km^{2} (0.386 sq mi or 247 acres) and river estuaries.

Barnas (French pronunciation: [baʁnas]) is a commune in the Ardèche department in the Auvergne-Rhône-Alpes region of southern France.

The inhabitants of the commune are known as Barnassiens or Barnassiennes.

== Geography ==
Barnas is located some 20 km west by northwest of Aubenas and 30 km east by southeast of Pradelles. Access to the commune is by Route nationale N102 which passes through the centre of the commune and the village from Mayres in the west and continuing to Thueyts in the east. The commune is mostly forest and moderately mountainous. There is a hotel and petrol station in the commune.

The Ardèche river flows through the commune from west to east parallel to the highway. There are a number of tributaries that feed into the river in the commune. On the right bank from west to east these are:

- The Ruisseau d'Abraham
- The Ruisseau des Combes
- The Ruisseau de l'Horesson
- The Ruisseau de Bournazon
- The Ruisseau de Chadenac Ou de Chateau which form the eastern border of the commune.

On the left bank the river is fed by:

- The Ruisseau du Grand VaVat
- The Rieu Jilieux
- The Ruisseau de la Farre
- The Ruisseau du Saut which forms the eastern border north of the river.

== History ==
Barnas appears as Barnas on the 1750 Cassini Map but does not appear at all on the 1790 version. The commune Barnas was created in 1913 from part of the commune of Thueyts.

=== Heraldry ===
Arms of Barnas	Blazon: Party per bend, at 1 a branch in pale with three apples to dexter 2 and 1; at 2 a mount of two hillocks mounted on a terrace in base charged with Bars gemelle wavy and a fess wavy in chief; over all a bend charged with 6 roundels in bend.

== Administration ==
List of Successive Mayors

From	To	Name	Party
1959	2001	René Vidal	PCF
2001	2020	Joel Laurent	
2020	2023	Jean-Luc Vidal	
2023	current	Lynda Bouet	

== Demography ==
Historical population

Year	Pop.	±% p.a.
1921	627	—
1926	556	−2.37%
1931	661	+3.52%
1936	605	−1.75%
1946	459	−2.72%
1954	405	−1.55%
1962	352	−1.74%
1968	307	−2.25%

Year	Pop.	±% p.a.
1975	219	−4.71%
1982	206	−0.87%
1990	214	+0.48%
1999	204	−0.53%
2007	223	+1.12%
2012	216	−0.64%
2017	207	−0.85%
2023	209	+0.16%

Source: EHESS and INSEE

== Sites and Monuments ==
- The Chapdenac Tower
- A 19th century Church
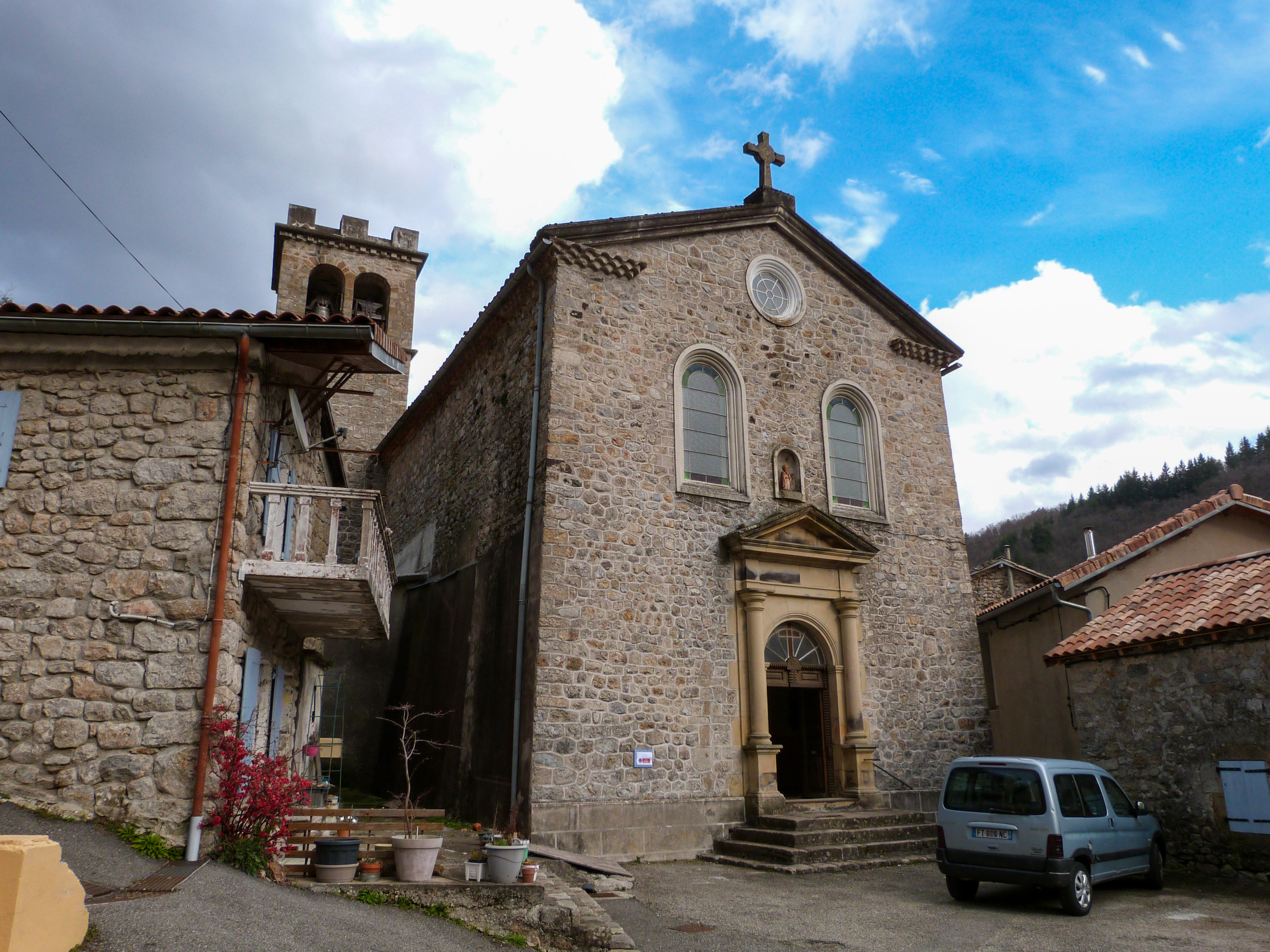
Church.

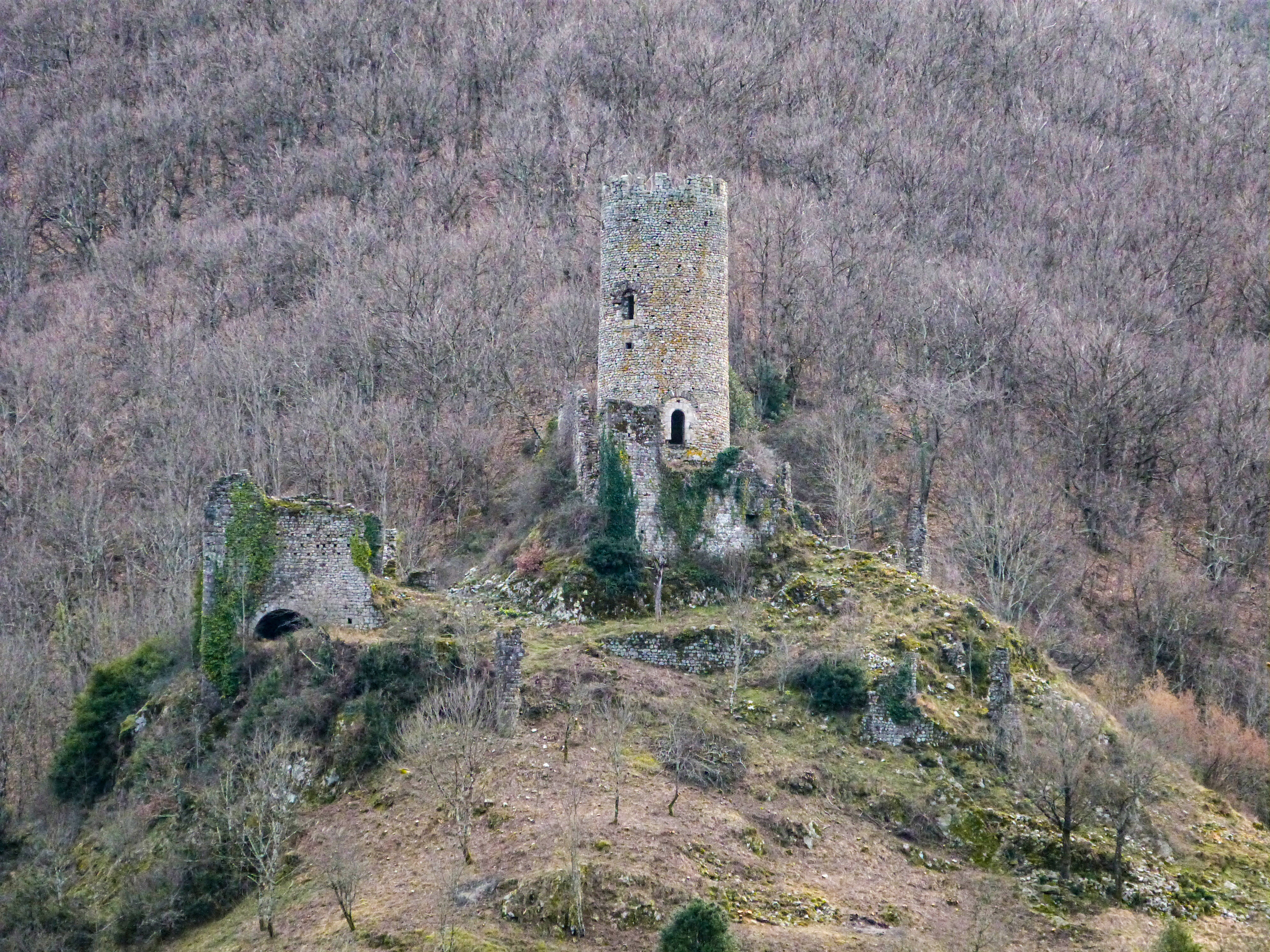
Chapdenac Tower.

== See also ==
- Communes of the Ardèche department
