= Chirols =

- Commune
- Location of Chirols
- Location within France Location within Auvergne-Rhône-Alpes
- Coordinates: 44°41′12″N 4°17′17″E
- Country: France
- Region: Auvergne-Rhône-Alpes
- Department: Ardèche
- Arrondissement: Largentière
- Canton: Haute-Ardèche
- Intercommunality: Ardèche des Sources et Volcans

Government
  - Mayor (2020–2026): Stéphane Ginevra
- Area^{1}: 6.91 km^{2} (2.67 sq mi)
- Elevation: 330 m (1,080 ft)
- Highest elevation: 969 m (3,179 ft)
- Lowest elevation: 320 m (1,050 ft)
- Population (2023): 289
  - Density: 41.8/km^{2} (108/sq mi)
- Time zone: UTC+01:00 (CET)
  - Summer (DST): UTC+02:00 (CEST)
- INSEE/Postal code: 07065 /07380
- ^{1} French Land Register data, which excludes lakes, ponds, glaciers > 1 km^{2} (0.386 sq mi or 247 acres) and river estuaries.

Chirols (French pronunciation: [ʃiʁɔl]; Occitan: Chiròus) is a commune in the Ardèche department in southern France.

== Population ==
Historical population
Year	Pop.	±% p.a.
1968	358	—
1975	316	−1.77%
1982	273	−2.07%
1990	223	−2.50%
1999	257	+1.59%
2007	256	−0.05%
2012	261	+0.39%
2017	241	−1.58%
2023	289	+3.07%
Source: INSEE

== See also ==
- Communes of the Ardèche department
