= Laveyrune =

- Commune
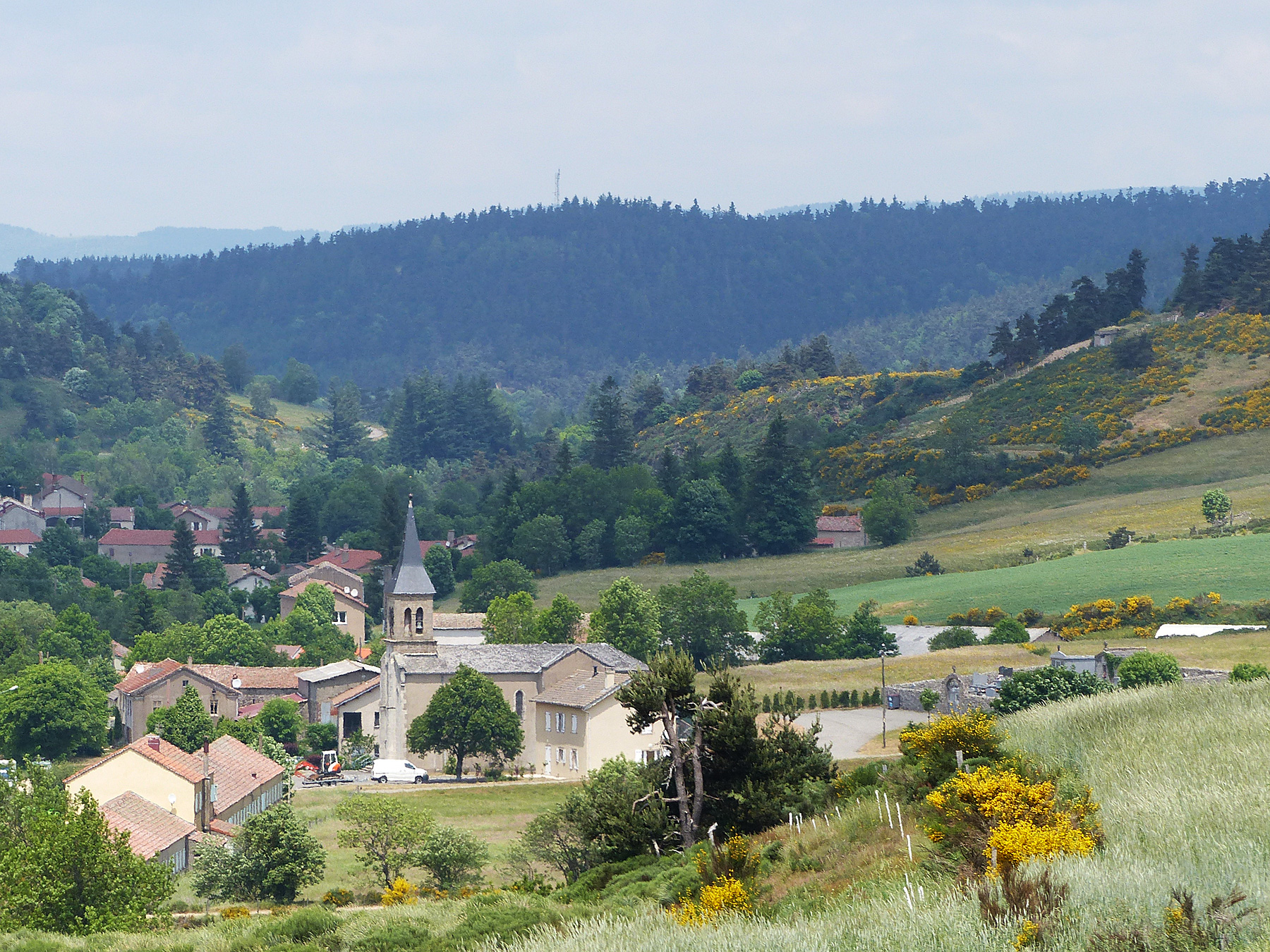
- Church and village from the south
- Location of Laveyrune
- Location within France Location within Auvergne-Rhône-Alpes
- Coordinates: 44°37′59″N 3°53′46″E
- Country: France
- Region: Auvergne-Rhône-Alpes
- Department: Ardèche
- Arrondissement: Largentière
- Canton: Haute-Ardèche

Government
  - Mayor (2020–2026): Alain Ranc
- Area^{1}: 13.44 km^{2} (5.19 sq mi)
- Elevation: 977 m (3,205 ft)
- Highest elevation: 1,365 m (4,478 ft)
- Lowest elevation: 974 m (3,196 ft)
- Population (2023): 111
  - Density: 8.26/km^{2} (21.4/sq mi)
- Time zone: UTC+01:00 (CET)
  - Summer (DST): UTC+02:00 (CEST)
- INSEE/Postal code: 07136 /48250
- ^{1} French Land Register data, which excludes lakes, ponds, glaciers > 1 km^{2} (0.386 sq mi or 247 acres) and river estuaries.

Laveyrune (French pronunciation: [laveʁyn]; Occitan: La Veiruna) is a commune in the Ardèche department in southern France. The Robert Louis Stevenson Trail (GR 70), a popular long-distance path, runs through the village.

== Population ==
Historical population
Year	Pop.	±% p.a.
1968	127	—
1975	108	−2.29%
1982	84	−3.53%
1990	112	+3.66%
1999	126	+1.32%
2007	129	+0.29%
2012	120	−1.44%
2017	107	−2.27%
2023	111	+0.61%
Source: INSEE

== See also ==
- Communes of the Ardèche department
