= Borne, Ardèche =

Borne
- Commune
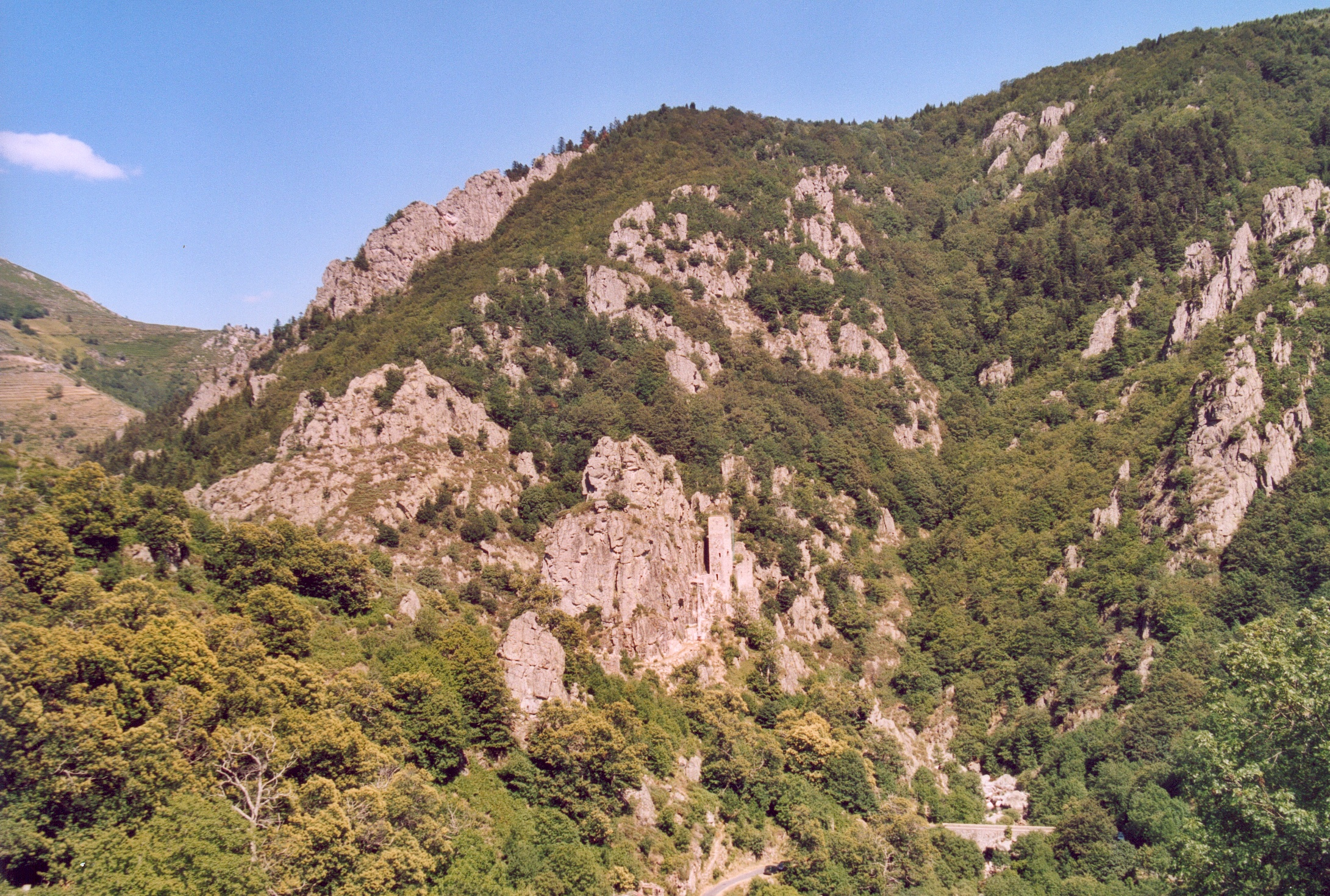
- The Tour de Borne

- Coat of arms
- Location of Borne
- Location within France Location within Auvergne-Rhône-Alpes
- Coordinates: 44°36′56″N 4°00′58″E
- Country: France
- Region: Auvergne-Rhône-Alpes
- Department: Ardèche
- Arrondissement: Largentière
- Canton: Haute-Ardèche

Government
  - Mayor (2020–2026): Thierry Champel
- Area^{1}: 32.01 km^{2} (12.36 sq mi)
- Elevation: 6,001 m (19,688 ft)
- Highest elevation: 1,506 m (4,941 ft)
- Lowest elevation: 750 m (2,460 ft)
- Population (2023): 42
  - Density: 1.3/km^{2} (3.4/sq mi)
- Time zone: UTC+01:00 (CET)
  - Summer (DST): UTC+02:00 (CEST)
- INSEE/Postal code: 07038 /07590
- ^{1} French Land Register data, which excludes lakes, ponds, glaciers > 1 km^{2} (0.386 sq mi or 247 acres) and river estuaries.

Borne (French pronunciation: [bɔʁn]; Occitan: Fasa) is a commune in the Ardèche department in southern France.

== Population ==
Historical population
Year	Pop.	±% p.a.
1968	66	—
1975	39	−7.24%
1982	31	−3.23%
1990	42	+3.87%
1999	41	−0.27%
2007	41	+0.00%
2012	38	−1.51%
2017	51	+6.06%
2023	42	−3.18%
Source: INSEE

== See also ==
- Communes of the Ardèche department
