= Usclades-et-Rieutord =

- Commune
- Location of Usclades-et-Rieutord
- Location within France Location within Auvergne-Rhône-Alpes
- Coordinates: 44°46′35″N 4°09′32″E
- Country: France
- Region: Auvergne-Rhône-Alpes
- Department: Ardèche
- Arrondissement: Largentière
- Canton: Haute-Ardèche

Government
  - Mayor (2020–2026): Sébastien Bourdely
- Area^{1}: 12.46 km^{2} (4.81 sq mi)
- Elevation: 1,270 m (4,170 ft)
- Highest elevation: 1,445 m (4,741 ft)
- Lowest elevation: 1,112 m (3,648 ft)
- Population (2023): 106
  - Density: 8.51/km^{2} (22.0/sq mi)
- Time zone: UTC+01:00 (CET)
  - Summer (DST): UTC+02:00 (CEST)
- INSEE/Postal code: 07326 /07510
- ^{1} French Land Register data, which excludes lakes, ponds, glaciers > 1 km^{2} (0.386 sq mi or 247 acres) and river estuaries.

Usclades-et-Rieutord (French pronunciation: [ysklad e ʁjœtɔʁ]; Occitan: Uscladas e Riutòrt) is a commune in the Ardèche department in southern France.

== Population ==
Historical population
Year	Pop.	±% p.a.
1968	169	—
1975	131	−3.57%
1982	115	−1.84%
1990	123	+0.84%
1999	102	−2.06%
2007	121	+2.16%
2012	130	+1.45%
2017	115	−2.42%
2023	106	−1.35%
Source: INSEE

== See also ==
- Communes of the Ardèche department
