= Issarlès =

- Commune
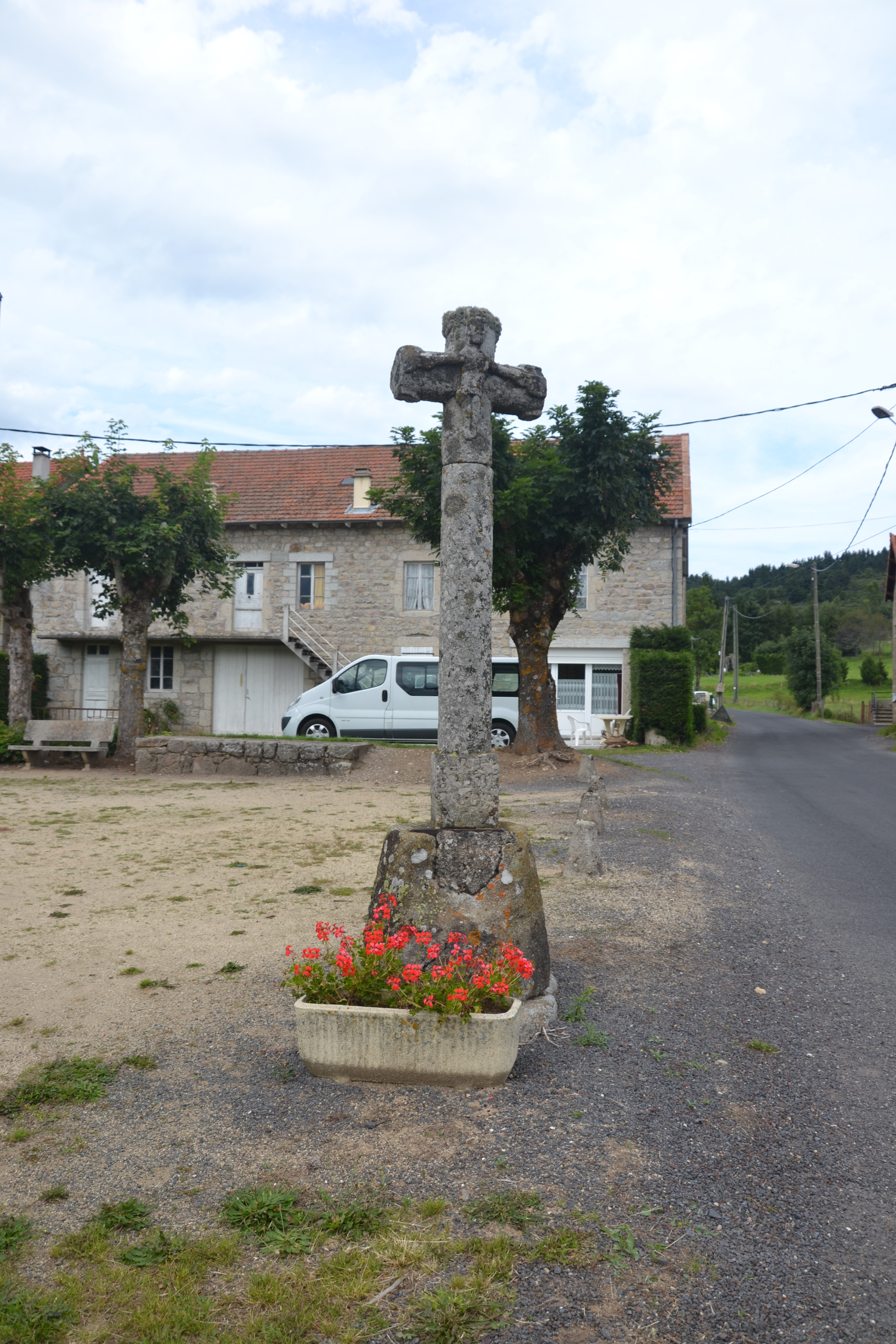
- The cross in Issarlès

- Coat of arms
- Location of Issarlès
- Location within France Location within Auvergne-Rhône-Alpes
- Coordinates: 44°50′41″N 4°01′54″E
- Country: France
- Region: Auvergne-Rhône-Alpes
- Department: Ardèche
- Arrondissement: Largentière
- Canton: Haute-Ardèche

Government
  - Mayor (2020–2026): Michel Testud
- Area^{1}: 18.44 km^{2} (7.12 sq mi)
- Elevation: 946 m (3,104 ft)
- Highest elevation: 1,266 m (4,154 ft)
- Lowest elevation: 850 m (2,790 ft)
- Population (2023): 125
  - Density: 6.78/km^{2} (17.6/sq mi)
- Time zone: UTC+01:00 (CET)
  - Summer (DST): UTC+02:00 (CEST)
- INSEE/Postal code: 07106 /07470
- ^{1} French Land Register data, which excludes lakes, ponds, glaciers > 1 km^{2} (0.386 sq mi or 247 acres) and river estuaries.

Issarlès (French pronunciation: [isaʁlɛs]; Occitan: Issarlés) is a commune in the Ardèche department in southern France. In 1929, the commune Le Lac-d'Issarlès was created from part of the commune Issarlès.

== Population ==
Historical population

Year	Pop.	±% p.a.
1793	1,203	—
1800	1,231	+0.33%
1806	1,251	+0.27%
1821	1,267	+0.08%
1831	1,422	+1.16%
1836	1,328	−1.36%
1841	1,499	+2.45%
1846	1,594	+1.24%
1851	1,464	−1.69%
1856	1,522	+0.78%
1861	1,614	+1.18%
1866	1,705	+1.10%
1872	1,665	−0.39%
1876	1,772	+1.57%
1881	1,895	+1.35%
1886	1,998	+1.06%
1891	1,886	−1.15%
1896	1,760	−1.37%
1901	1,740	−0.23%

Year	Pop.	±% p.a.
1906	1,724	−0.18%
1911	1,606	−1.41%
1921	1,543	−0.40%
1926	1,416	−1.70%
1931	804	−10.70%
1936	767	−0.94%
1946	657	−1.54%
1954	616	−0.80%
1962	516	−2.19%
1968	428	−3.07%
1975	332	−3.56%
1982	245	−4.25%
1990	217	−1.51%
1999	166	−2.93%
2007	164	−0.15%
2012	170	+0.72%
2017	145	−3.13%
2023	125	−2.44%

Source: EHESS and INSEE (1968-2023)

== See also ==
- Communes of the Ardèche department
