= Saint-Cirgues-de-Prades =

- Commune
- Location of Saint-Cirgues-de-Prades
- Location within France Location within Auvergne-Rhône-Alpes
- Coordinates: 44°37′28″N 4°16′21″E
- Country: France
- Region: Auvergne-Rhône-Alpes
- Department: Ardèche
- Arrondissement: Largentière
- Canton: Haute-Ardèche

Government
  - Mayor (2020–2026): Thierry Pallot
- Area^{1}: 3.48 km^{2} (1.34 sq mi)
- Elevation: 450 m (1,480 ft)
- Highest elevation: 861 m (2,825 ft)
- Lowest elevation: 319 m (1,047 ft)
- Population (2023): 142
  - Density: 40.8/km^{2} (106/sq mi)
- Time zone: UTC+01:00 (CET)
  - Summer (DST): UTC+02:00 (CEST)
- INSEE/Postal code: 07223 /07380
- ^{1} French Land Register data, which excludes lakes, ponds, glaciers > 1 km^{2} (0.386 sq mi or 247 acres) and river estuaries.

Saint-Cirgues-de-Prades (French pronunciation: [sɛ̃ siʁɡ də pʁad], literally Saint-Cirgues of Prades; Occitan: Sent Cirgue de Pradas) is a commune in the Ardèche department in southern France.

== Population ==
Historical population
Year	Pop.	±% p.a.
1968	83	—
1975	69	−2.60%
1982	62	−1.52%
1990	85	+4.02%
1999	98	+1.59%
2007	130	+3.60%
2012	128	−0.31%
2017	140	+1.81%
2023	142	+0.24%
Source: INSEE

== See also ==
- Communes of the Ardèche department
