= Mazan-l'Abbaye =

- Commune
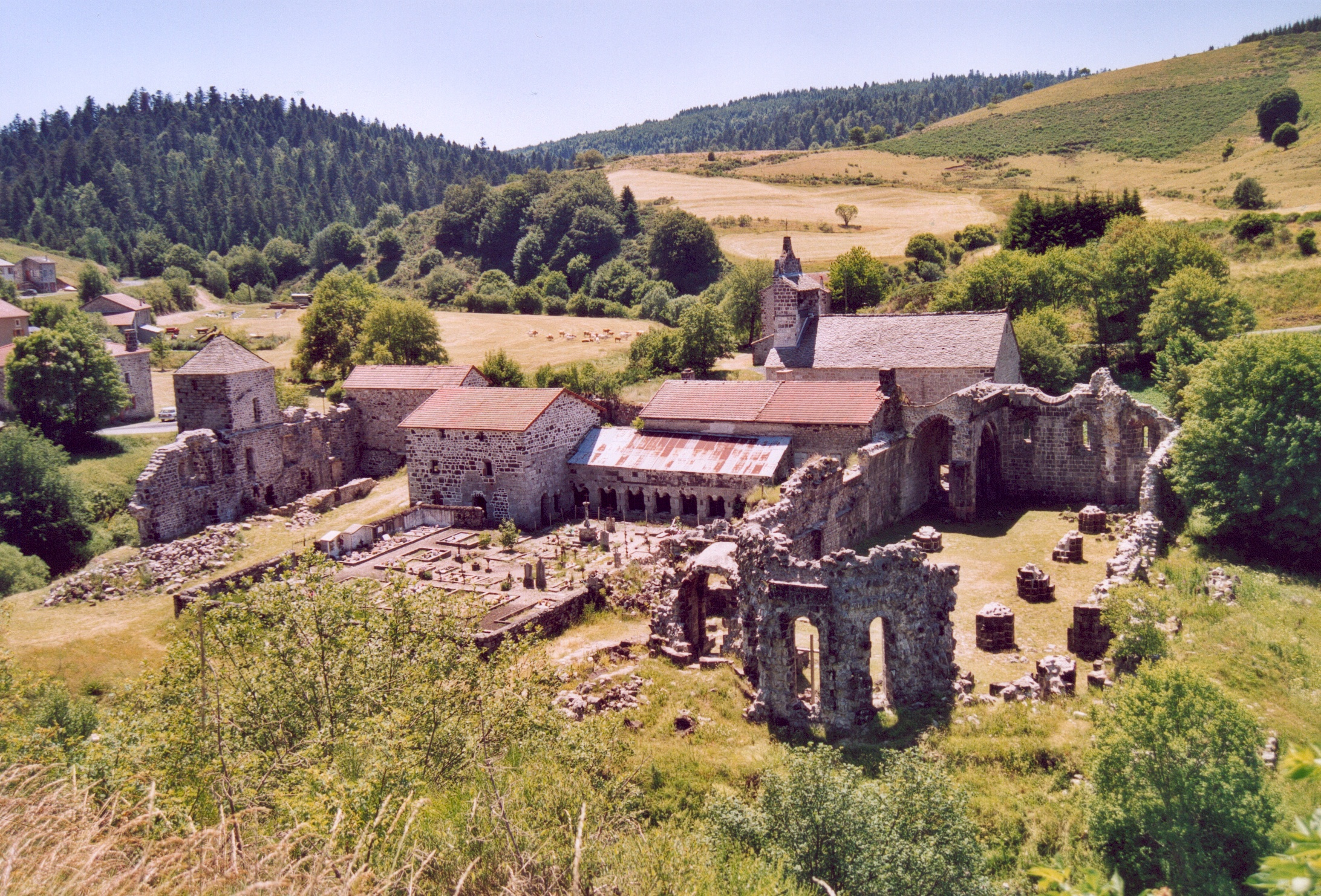
- A view of Mazan-l'Abbaye
- Location of Mazan-l'Abbaye
- Location within France Location within Auvergne-Rhône-Alpes
- Coordinates: 44°43′45″N 4°05′23″E
- Country: France
- Region: Auvergne-Rhône-Alpes
- Department: Ardèche
- Arrondissement: Largentière
- Canton: Haute-Ardèche

Government
  - Mayor (2020–2026): Thibault Robert
- Area^{1}: 44.79 km^{2} (17.29 sq mi)
- Elevation: 1,125 m (3,691 ft)
- Highest elevation: 1,446 m (4,744 ft)
- Lowest elevation: 874 m (2,867 ft)
- Population (2023): 120
  - Density: 2.7/km^{2} (6.9/sq mi)
- Time zone: UTC+01:00 (CET)
  - Summer (DST): UTC+02:00 (CEST)
- INSEE/Postal code: 07154 /07510
- ^{1} French Land Register data, which excludes lakes, ponds, glaciers > 1 km^{2} (0.386 sq mi or 247 acres) and river estuaries.

Mazan-l'Abbaye (French pronunciation: [mazɑ̃ labei]; Occitan: Masan de l'Abadiá) is a commune in the Ardèche department in southern France.

== Population ==
Historical population
Year	Pop.	±% p.a.
1968	356	—
1975	280	−3.37%
1982	229	−2.83%
1990	210	−1.08%
1999	163	−2.78%
2007	139	−1.97%
2012	139	+0.00%
2017	122	−2.58%
2023	120	−0.28%
Source: INSEE

== See also ==
- Mazan Abbey
- Communes of the Ardèche department
