= Péreyres =

- Commune
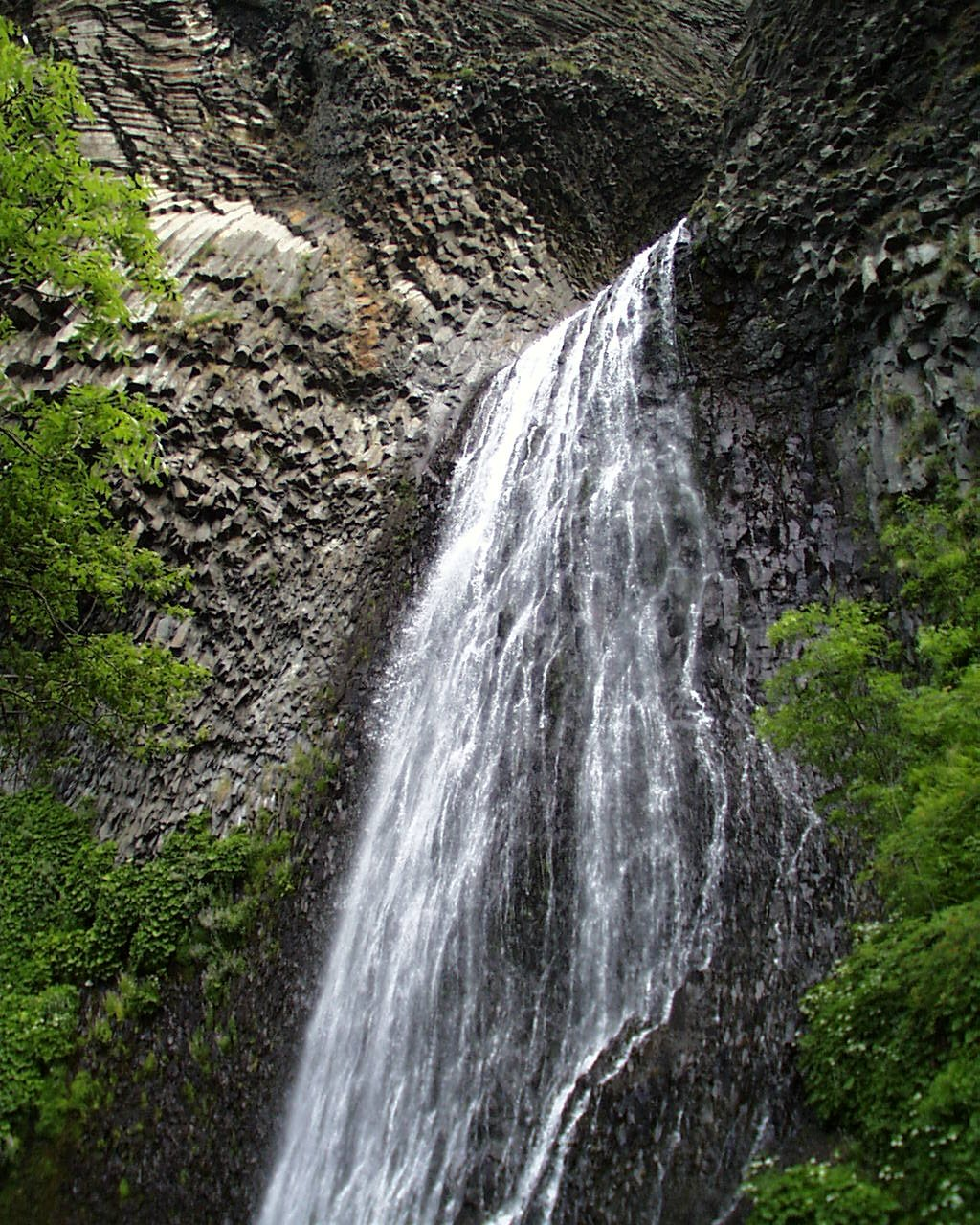
- Ray Pic waterfall
- Location of Péreyres
- Location within France Location within Auvergne-Rhône-Alpes
- Coordinates: 44°46′40″N 4°15′16″E
- Country: France
- Region: Auvergne-Rhône-Alpes
- Department: Ardèche
- Arrondissement: Largentière
- Canton: Haute-Ardèche

Government
  - Mayor (2020–2026): Georges Bonnet
- Area^{1}: 12.63 km^{2} (4.88 sq mi)
- Elevation: 750 m (2,460 ft)
- Highest elevation: 1,400 m (4,600 ft)
- Lowest elevation: 676 m (2,218 ft)
- Population (2023): 49
  - Density: 3.9/km^{2} (10/sq mi)
- Time zone: UTC+01:00 (CET)
  - Summer (DST): UTC+02:00 (CEST)
- INSEE/Postal code: 07173 /07450
- ^{1} French Land Register data, which excludes lakes, ponds, glaciers > 1 km^{2} (0.386 sq mi or 247 acres) and river estuaries.

Péreyres (French pronunciation: [peʁɛʁ]; Occitan: Pereiras) is a commune in the Ardèche department in the Auvergne-Rhône-Alpes region in southern France.

== Population ==
Historical population
| Year | Pop. | ±% p.a. |
|---|---|---|
| 1968 | 75 | — |
| 1975 | 63 | −2.46% |
| 1982 | 62 | −0.23% |
| 1990 | 62 | +0.00% |
| 1999 | 55 | −1.32% |
| 2007 | 53 | −0.46% |
| 2012 | 51 | −0.77% |
| 2017 | 49 | −0.80% |
| 2023 | 49 | +0.00% |
Source: INSEE

== See also ==
- Communes of the Ardèche department
