= Lalevade-d'Ardèche =

- Commune
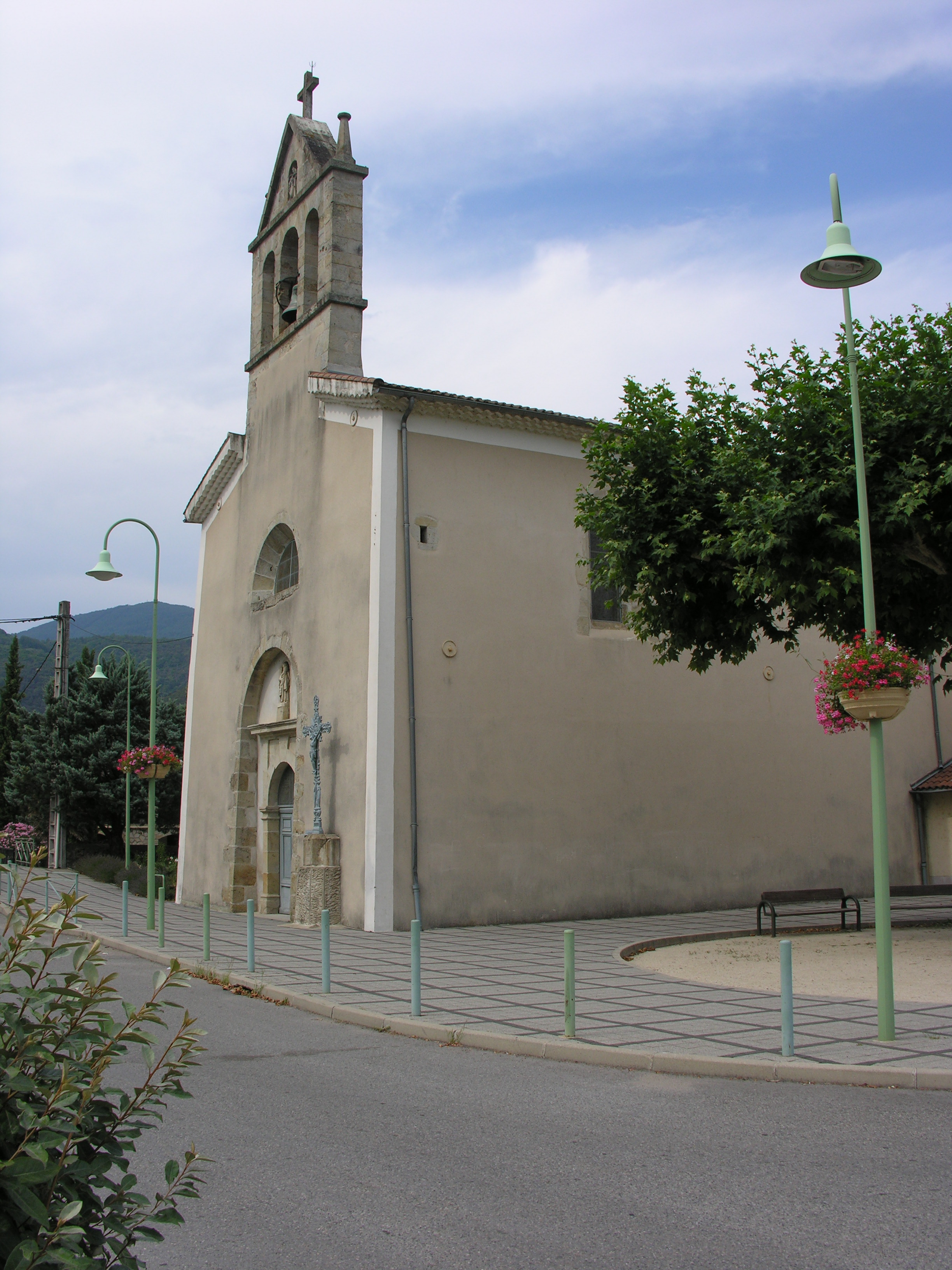
- The church in Lalevade-d'Ardèche
- Location of Lalevade-d'Ardèche
- Location within France Location within Auvergne-Rhône-Alpes
- Coordinates: 44°38′55″N 4°19′26″E
- Country: France
- Region: Auvergne-Rhône-Alpes
- Department: Ardèche
- Arrondissement: Largentière
- Canton: Haute-Ardèche
- Intercommunality: Ardèche des Sources et Volcans

Government
  - Mayor (2020–2026): Dominique Fialon
- Area^{1}: 2.27 km^{2} (0.88 sq mi)
- Elevation: 263 m (863 ft)
- Highest elevation: 490 m (1,610 ft)
- Lowest elevation: 255 m (837 ft)
- Population (2023): 1,120
  - Density: 493/km^{2} (1,280/sq mi)
- Time zone: UTC+01:00 (CET)
  - Summer (DST): UTC+02:00 (CEST)
- INSEE/Postal code: 07127 /07380
- ^{1} French Land Register data, which excludes lakes, ponds, glaciers > 1 km^{2} (0.386 sq mi or 247 acres) and river estuaries.

Lalevade-d'Ardèche (French pronunciation: [lalvad daʁdɛʃ]; Occitan: La Levada d'Ardecha) is a commune in the Ardèche department in southern France.

It is the commune with the smallest area in the department.

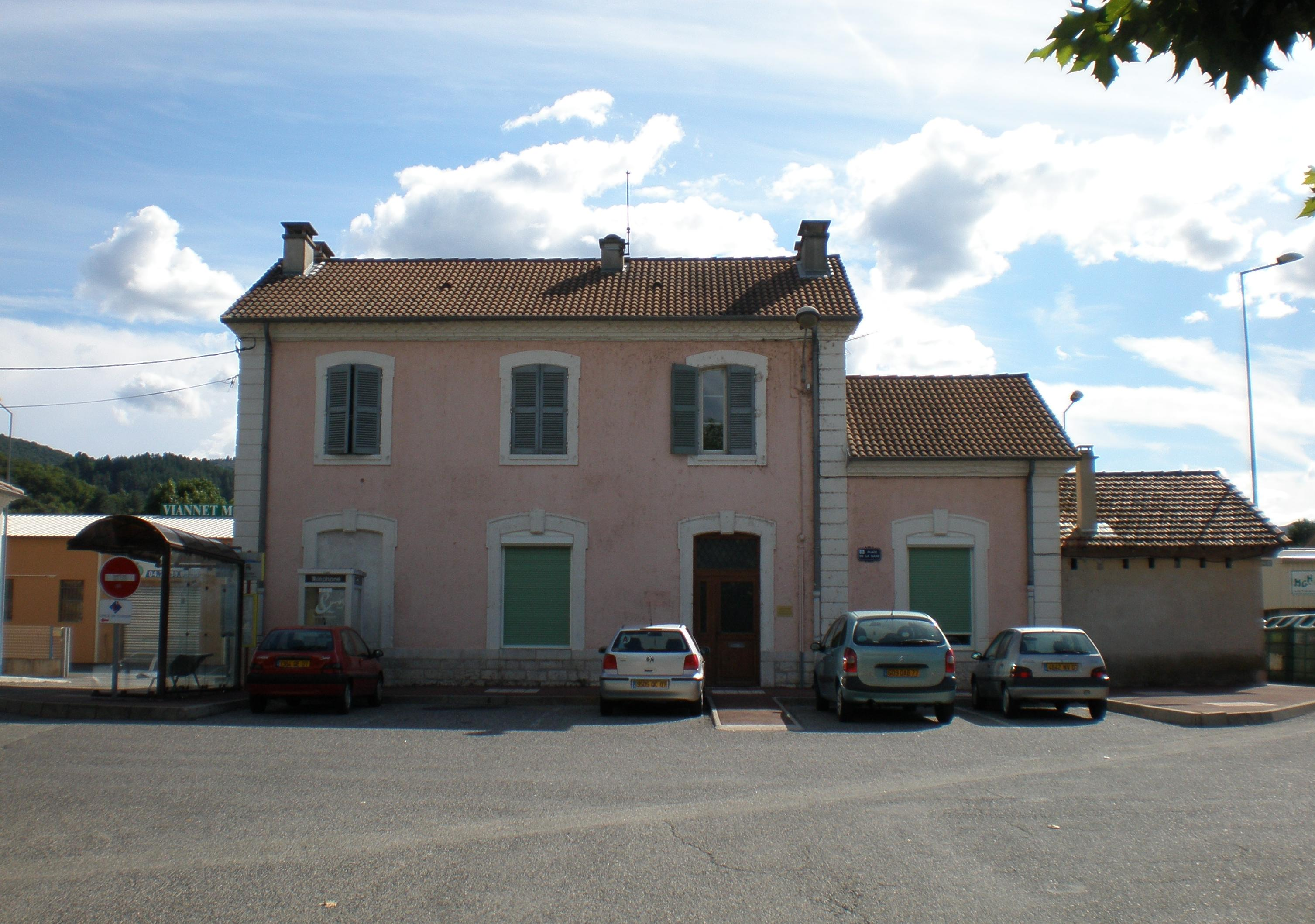
Old train station, now the town hall

== Economy ==
In the 19th century, the commune was an active industrial center, with coal mines and tanneries. Today, the economy is dominated by tourism.

== Population ==
The population has remained relatively stable since 1903, when it ceded part of its territory to the new commune Pont-de-Labeaume.

Historical population

Year	Pop.	±% p.a.
1793	640	—
1800	695	+1.18%
1806	766	+1.63%
1821	934	+1.33%
1831	1,157	+2.16%
1836	1,225	+1.15%
1841	1,228	+0.05%
1846	1,311	+1.32%
1851	1,320	+0.14%
1856	1,249	−1.10%
1861	1,332	+1.30%
1866	1,288	−0.67%
1872	1,428	+1.73%
1876	1,594	+2.79%
1881	1,677	+1.02%
1886	1,800	+1.43%
1891	1,996	+2.09%
1896	1,976	−0.20%
1901	2,088	+1.11%

Year	Pop.	±% p.a.
1906	1,349	−8.37%
1911	1,288	−0.92%
1921	1,301	+0.10%
1926	1,264	−0.58%
1931	1,278	+0.22%
1936	1,108	−2.81%
1946	1,124	+0.14%
1954	1,096	−0.31%
1962	1,129	+0.37%
1968	1,150	+0.31%
1975	1,199	+0.60%
1982	1,103	−1.19%
1990	1,012	−1.07%
1999	1,032	+0.22%
2007	1,177	+1.66%
2012	1,160	−0.29%
2017	1,107	−0.93%
2023	1,120	+0.19%

Source: EHESS and INSEE (1968-2023)

== See also ==
- Communes of the Ardèche department
