= Lachapelle-Graillouse =

- Commune
- Location of Lachapelle-Graillouse
- Location within France Location within Auvergne-Rhône-Alpes
- Coordinates: 44°48′48″N 4°01′15″E
- Country: France
- Region: Auvergne-Rhône-Alpes
- Department: Ardèche
- Arrondissement: Largentière
- Canton: Haute-Ardèche

Government
  - Mayor (2020–2026): Roland Jallat
- Area^{1}: 20.48 km^{2} (7.91 sq mi)
- Elevation: 1,120 m (3,670 ft)
- Highest elevation: 1,233 m (4,045 ft)
- Lowest elevation: 868 m (2,848 ft)
- Population (2023): 182
  - Density: 8.89/km^{2} (23.0/sq mi)
- Time zone: UTC+01:00 (CET)
  - Summer (DST): UTC+02:00 (CEST)
- INSEE/Postal code: 07121 /07470
- ^{1} French Land Register data, which excludes lakes, ponds, glaciers > 1 km^{2} (0.386 sq mi or 247 acres) and river estuaries.

Lachapelle-Graillouse (French pronunciation: [laʃapɛl ɡʁajuz]; Occitan: La Chapèla Gralhosa) is a commune in the Ardèche department in southern France.

== Population ==
Historical population
Year	Pop.	±% p.a.
1968	546	—
1975	452	−2.66%
1982	376	−2.60%
1990	293	−3.07%
1999	237	−2.33%
2007	235	−0.11%
2012	245	+0.84%
2017	199	−4.07%
2023	182	−1.48%
Source: INSEE

== See also ==
- Communes of the Ardèche department
