= Cellier-du-Luc =

- Commune
- Location of Cellier-du-Luc
- Location within France Location within Auvergne-Rhône-Alpes
- Coordinates: 44°40′50″N 3°54′06″E
- Country: France
- Region: Auvergne-Rhône-Alpes
- Department: Ardèche
- Arrondissement: Largentière
- Canton: Haute-Ardèche
- Intercommunality: Montagne d'Ardèche

Government
  - Mayor (2020–2026): Jérôme Gros
- Area^{1}: 14.73 km^{2} (5.69 sq mi)
- Elevation: 950 m (3,120 ft)
- Highest elevation: 1,202 m (3,944 ft)
- Lowest elevation: 932 m (3,058 ft)
- Population (2023): 91
  - Density: 6.2/km^{2} (16/sq mi)
- Time zone: UTC+01:00 (CET)
  - Summer (DST): UTC+02:00 (CEST)
- INSEE/Postal code: 07047 /07590
- ^{1} French Land Register data, which excludes lakes, ponds, glaciers > 1 km^{2} (0.386 sq mi or 247 acres) and river estuaries.

Cellier-du-Luc (French pronunciation: [sɛlje dy lyk]; Occitan: Cellier du Luc) is a commune in the Ardèche department in southern France.

== Population ==
Historical population
Year	Pop.	±% p.a.
1968	122	—
1975	107	−1.86%
1982	93	−1.98%
1990	106	+1.65%
1999	99	−0.76%
2007	105	+0.74%
2012	98	−1.37%
2017	77	−4.71%
2023	91	+2.82%
Source: INSEE

== See also ==
- Communes of the Ardèche department
