= Le Roux, Ardèche =

Le Roux
- Commune
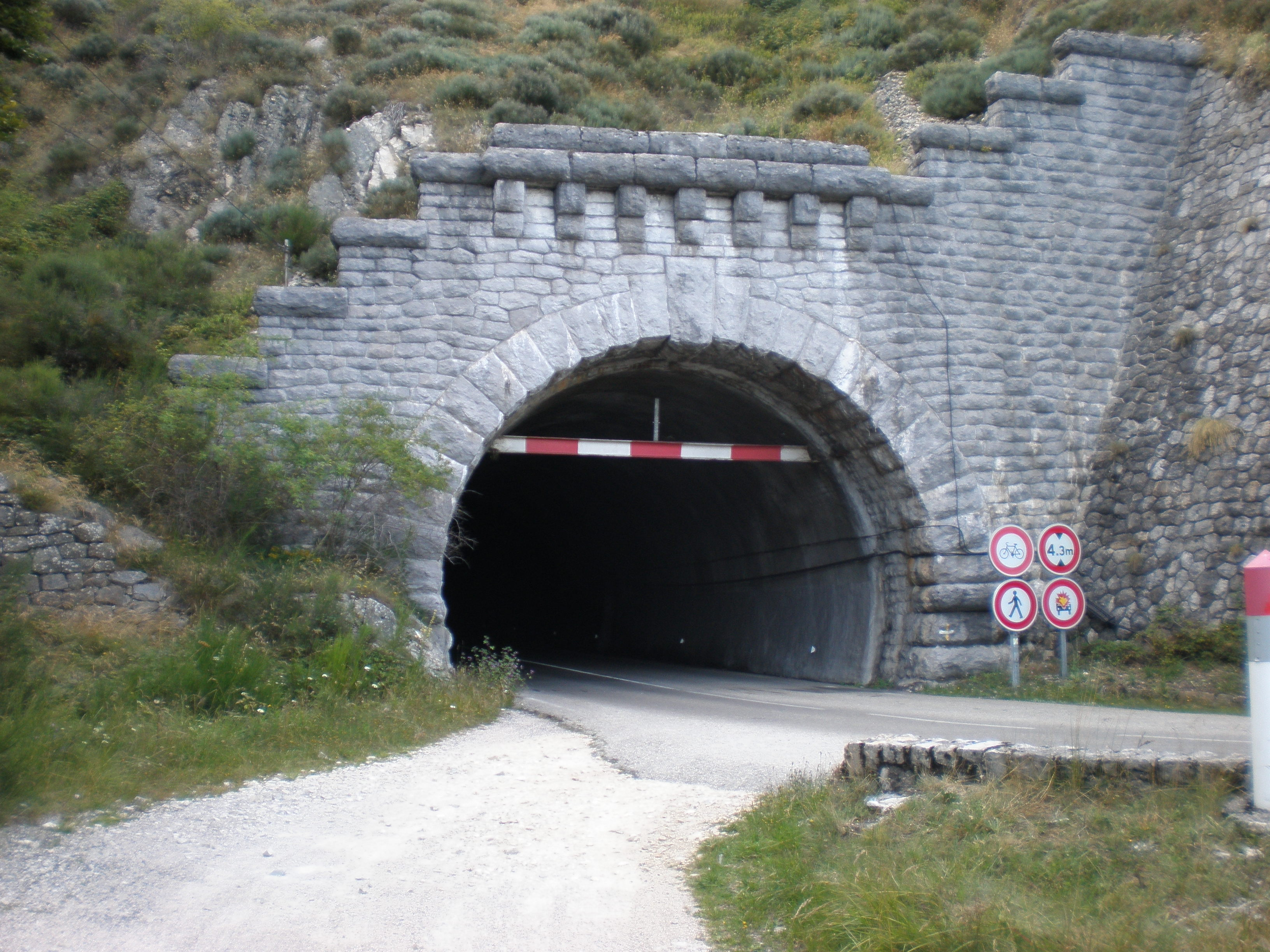
- The entrance to the Tunnel du Roux
- Location of Le Roux
- Location within France Location within Auvergne-Rhône-Alpes
- Coordinates: 44°43′28″N 4°08′51″E
- Country: France
- Region: Auvergne-Rhône-Alpes
- Department: Ardèche
- Arrondissement: Largentière
- Canton: Haute-Ardèche

Government
  - Mayor (2020–2026): Joseph Volle
- Area^{1}: 16.43 km^{2} (6.34 sq mi)
- Elevation: 830 m (2,720 ft)
- Highest elevation: 1,348 m (4,423 ft)
- Lowest elevation: 627 m (2,057 ft)
- Population (2023): 67
  - Density: 4.1/km^{2} (11/sq mi)
- Time zone: UTC+01:00 (CET)
  - Summer (DST): UTC+02:00 (CEST)
- INSEE/Postal code: 07200 /07560
- ^{1} French Land Register data, which excludes lakes, ponds, glaciers > 1 km^{2} (0.386 sq mi or 247 acres) and river estuaries.

Le Roux (French pronunciation: [lə ʁu]; Occitan: Lo Ros) is a commune in the Ardèche department in southern France.

== Population ==
Historical population
Year	Pop.	±% p.a.
1968	123	—
1975	88	−4.67%
1982	71	−3.02%
1990	43	−6.08%
1999	43	+0.00%
2007	37	−1.86%
2012	44	+3.53%
2017	53	+3.79%
2023	67	+3.98%
Source: INSEE

== See also ==
- Communes of the Ardèche department
