= Sagnes-et-Goudoulet =

- Commune
- Location of Sagnes-et-Goudoulet
- Location within France Location within Auvergne-Rhône-Alpes
- Coordinates: 44°47′28″N 4°13′36″E
- Country: France
- Region: Auvergne-Rhône-Alpes
- Department: Ardèche
- Arrondissement: Largentière
- Canton: Haute-Ardèche

Government
  - Mayor (2020–2026): Isabelle Leveque
- Area^{1}: 25.02 km^{2} (9.66 sq mi)
- Elevation: 1,240 m (4,070 ft)
- Highest elevation: 1,527 m (5,010 ft)
- Lowest elevation: 1,080 m (3,540 ft)
- Population (2023): 121
  - Density: 4.84/km^{2} (12.5/sq mi)
- Time zone: UTC+01:00 (CET)
  - Summer (DST): UTC+02:00 (CEST)
- INSEE/Postal code: 07203 /07450
- ^{1} French Land Register data, which excludes lakes, ponds, glaciers > 1 km^{2} (0.386 sq mi or 247 acres) and river estuaries.

Sagnes-et-Goudoulet (French pronunciation: [saɲ e ɡudulɛ]; Occitan: Las Sanhas e Godolet) is a commune in the Ardèche department in southern France.

== Population ==
Historical population
Year	Pop.	±% p.a.
1968	322	—
1975	198	−6.71%
1982	182	−1.20%
1990	146	−2.72%
1999	131	−1.20%
2007	136	+0.47%
2012	131	−0.75%
2017	117	−2.24%
2023	121	+0.56%
Source: INSEE

== See also ==
- Communes of the Ardèche department
