= Saint-Pierre-de-Colombier =

- Commune
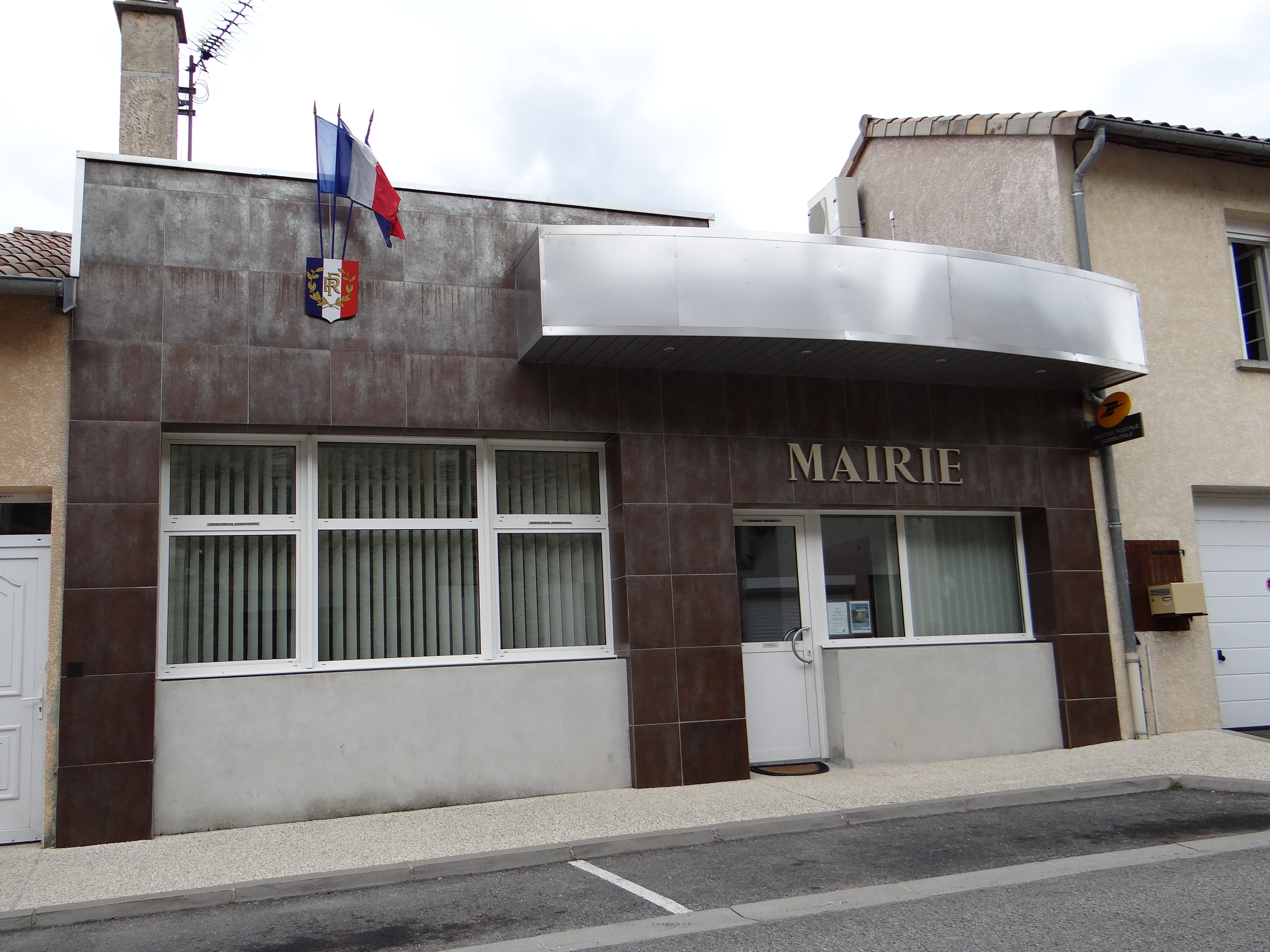
- Town hall
- Location of Saint-Pierre-de-Colombier
- Location within France Location within Auvergne-Rhône-Alpes
- Coordinates: 44°42′19″N 4°15′47″E
- Country: France
- Region: Auvergne-Rhône-Alpes
- Department: Ardèche
- Arrondissement: Largentière
- Canton: Haute-Ardèche

Government
  - Mayor (2020–2026): Gérard Fargier
- Area^{1}: 9.43 km^{2} (3.64 sq mi)
- Elevation: 400 m (1,300 ft)
- Highest elevation: 1,062 m (3,484 ft)
- Lowest elevation: 360 m (1,180 ft)
- Population (2023): 444
  - Density: 47.1/km^{2} (122/sq mi)
- Time zone: UTC+01:00 (CET)
  - Summer (DST): UTC+02:00 (CEST)
- INSEE/Postal code: 07282 /07450
- ^{1} French Land Register data, which excludes lakes, ponds, glaciers > 1 km^{2} (0.386 sq mi or 247 acres) and river estuaries.

Saint-Pierre-de-Colombier (French pronunciation: [sɛ̃ pjɛʁ də kɔlɔ̃bje]; Occitan: Sant Pierre de Colombier) is a commune in the Ardèche department in southern France.

== Population ==
Historical population
Year	Pop.	±% p.a.
1968	454	—
1975	373	−2.77%
1982	385	+0.45%
1990	388	+0.10%
1999	382	−0.17%
2007	380	−0.07%
2012	407	+1.38%
2017	411	+0.20%
2023	444	+1.30%
Source: INSEE

On Saturday, October 14, 2023, a skirmish between an ecological-minded group called Les Amis de la Bourges, translated to English as "The Friends of the Village," and a group of nuns developed on the construction site of what has been called a “mega-church.” A determined nun was videod tackling one of the protesters as he attempted to leave the site with some plastic pipe from the site. “Sister Without Mercy” and other humorous such headlines pervaded new outlets as the video was widely published, calling attention to the various ecological concerns of the protesters, including the impending destruction of habitat of several protected species.

== See also ==
- Communes of the Ardèche department
