= Saint-Cirgues-en-Montagne =

- Commune
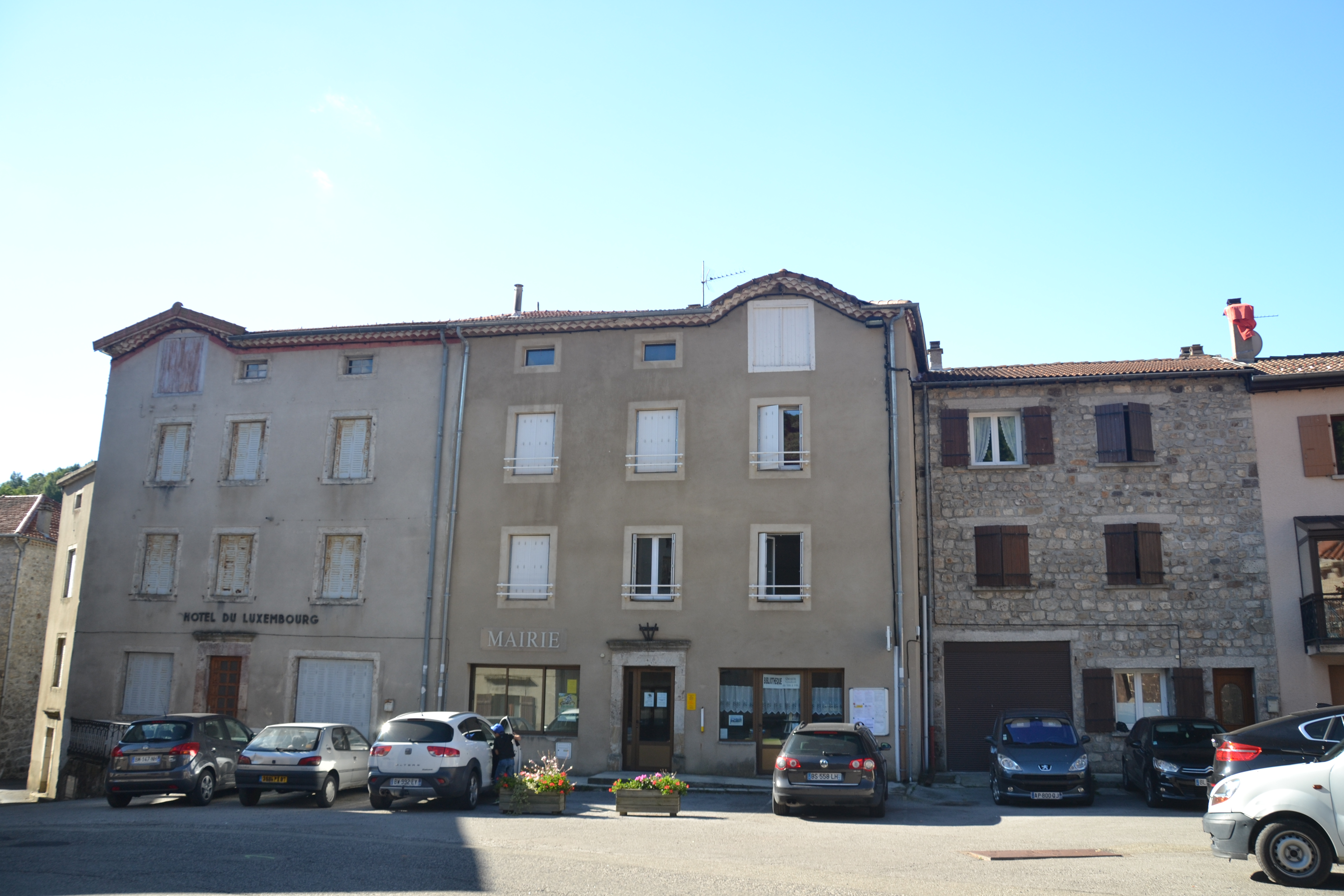
- The town hall in Saint-Cirgues-en-Montagne
- Location of Saint-Cirgues-en-Montagne
- Location within France Location within Auvergne-Rhône-Alpes
- Coordinates: 44°45′24″N 4°05′33″E
- Country: France
- Region: Auvergne-Rhône-Alpes
- Department: Ardèche
- Arrondissement: Largentière
- Canton: Haute-Ardèche

Government
  - Mayor (2020–2026): Karine Accassat
- Area^{1}: 21.78 km^{2} (8.41 sq mi)
- Elevation: 1,044 m (3,425 ft)
- Highest elevation: 1,464 m (4,803 ft)
- Lowest elevation: 919 m (3,015 ft)
- Population (2023): 211
  - Density: 9.69/km^{2} (25.1/sq mi)
- Time zone: UTC+01:00 (CET)
  - Summer (DST): UTC+02:00 (CEST)
- INSEE/Postal code: 07224 /07510
- ^{1} French Land Register data, which excludes lakes, ponds, glaciers > 1 km^{2} (0.386 sq mi or 247 acres) and river estuaries.

Saint-Cirgues-en-Montagne (French pronunciation: [sɛ̃ siʁɡ ɑ̃ mɔ̃taɲ]; Occitan: Sant Cirgue de Montanha) is a commune in the Ardèche department in southern France.

== Population ==
Historical population
Year	Pop.	±% p.a.
1968	498	—
1975	462	−1.07%
1982	397	−2.14%
1990	361	−1.18%
1999	285	−2.59%
2007	251	−1.58%
2012	251	+0.00%
2017	210	−3.50%
2023	211	+0.08%
Source: INSEE

== See also ==
- Communes of the Ardèche department
