= Issanlas =

- Commune
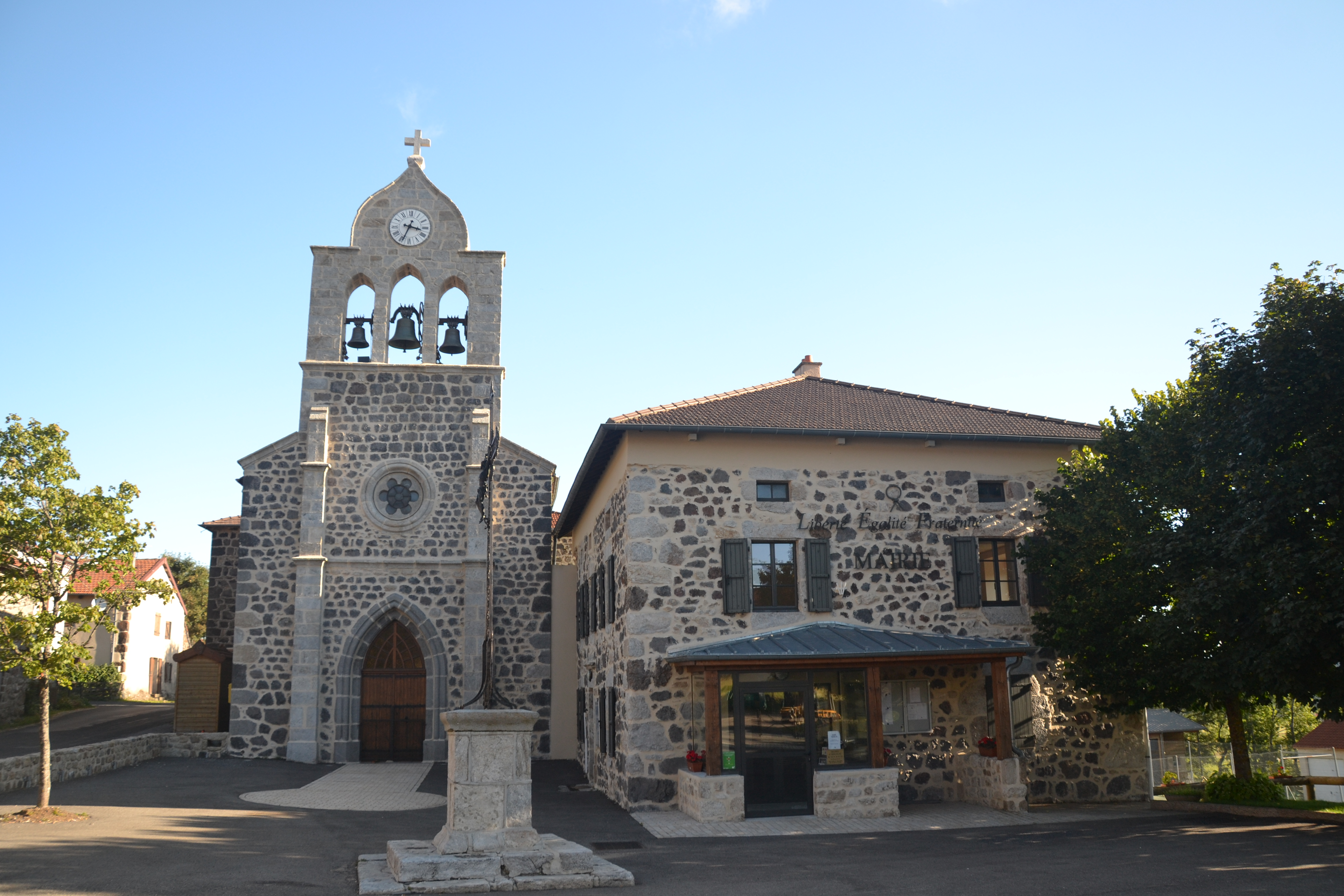
- The church and town hall in Issanlas
- Location of Issanlas
- Location within France Location within Auvergne-Rhône-Alpes
- Coordinates: 44°45′57″N 4°00′44″E
- Country: France
- Region: Auvergne-Rhône-Alpes
- Department: Ardèche
- Arrondissement: Largentière
- Canton: Haute-Ardèche

Government
  - Mayor (2023–2026): John Serroul
- Area^{1}: 28.4 km^{2} (11.0 sq mi)
- Elevation: 1,180 m (3,870 ft)
- Highest elevation: 1,374 m (4,508 ft)
- Lowest elevation: 1,119 m (3,671 ft)
- Population (2023): 104
  - Density: 3.66/km^{2} (9.48/sq mi)
- Time zone: UTC+01:00 (CET)
  - Summer (DST): UTC+02:00 (CEST)
- INSEE/Postal code: 07105 /07510
- ^{1} French Land Register data, which excludes lakes, ponds, glaciers > 1 km^{2} (0.386 sq mi or 247 acres) and river estuaries.

Issanlas is a commune in the Ardèche department in southern France.

== Climate ==
Climate data for Issanlas (Mezeyrac), 1215m (1981−2010 normals, 1952−2022 extremes)
Month	Jan	Feb	Mar	Apr	May	Jun	Jul	Aug	Sep	Oct	Nov	Dec	Year
Record high °C (°F)	17.9 (64.2)	19.2 (66.6)	21.6 (70.9)	21.7 (71.1)	27.9 (82.2)	33.7 (92.7)	33.0 (91.4)	32.3 (90.1)	30.5 (86.9)	23.6 (74.5)	21.5 (70.7)	19.4 (66.9)	33.7 (92.7)
Mean daily maximum °C (°F)	2.5 (36.5)	3.1 (37.6)	6.2 (43.2)	9.0 (48.2)	13.6 (56.5)	17.7 (63.9)	21.1 (70.0)	20.7 (69.3)	16.3 (61.3)	11.7 (53.1)	5.9 (42.6)	3.1 (37.6)	10.9 (51.7)
Daily mean °C (°F)	−0.8 (30.6)	−0.4 (31.3)	2.2 (36.0)	4.7 (40.5)	9.0 (48.2)	12.6 (54.7)	15.4 (59.7)	15.2 (59.4)	11.4 (52.5)	7.9 (46.2)	2.6 (36.7)	0.0 (32.0)	6.7 (44.0)
Mean daily minimum °C (°F)	−4.1 (24.6)	−3.9 (25.0)	−1.9 (28.6)	0.4 (32.7)	4.3 (39.7)	7.5 (45.5)	9.7 (49.5)	9.6 (49.3)	6.6 (43.9)	4.0 (39.2)	−0.6 (30.9)	−3.1 (26.4)	2.4 (36.3)
Record low °C (°F)	−23.0 (−9.4)	−25.0 (−13.0)	−24.0 (−11.2)	−12.0 (10.4)	−5.7 (21.7)	−2.8 (27.0)	0.0 (32.0)	0.2 (32.4)	−3.0 (26.6)	−9.0 (15.8)	−15.0 (5.0)	−19.8 (−3.6)	−25.0 (−13.0)
Average precipitation mm (inches)	69.5 (2.74)	51.1 (2.01)	52.4 (2.06)	102.6 (4.04)	123.9 (4.88)	85.2 (3.35)	59.5 (2.34)	72.7 (2.86)	123.5 (4.86)	133.9 (5.27)	119.9 (4.72)	82.9 (3.26)	1,077.1 (42.39)
Source: Meteociel

== Population ==
Historical population
Year	Pop.	±% p.a.
1968	304	—
1975	240	−3.32%
1982	187	−3.50%
1990	150	−2.72%
1999	129	−1.66%
2007	127	−0.20%
2012	114	−2.14%
2017	102	−2.20%
2023	104	+0.32%
Source: INSEE

== See also ==
- Communes of the Ardèche department
