= Lespéron =

- Commune
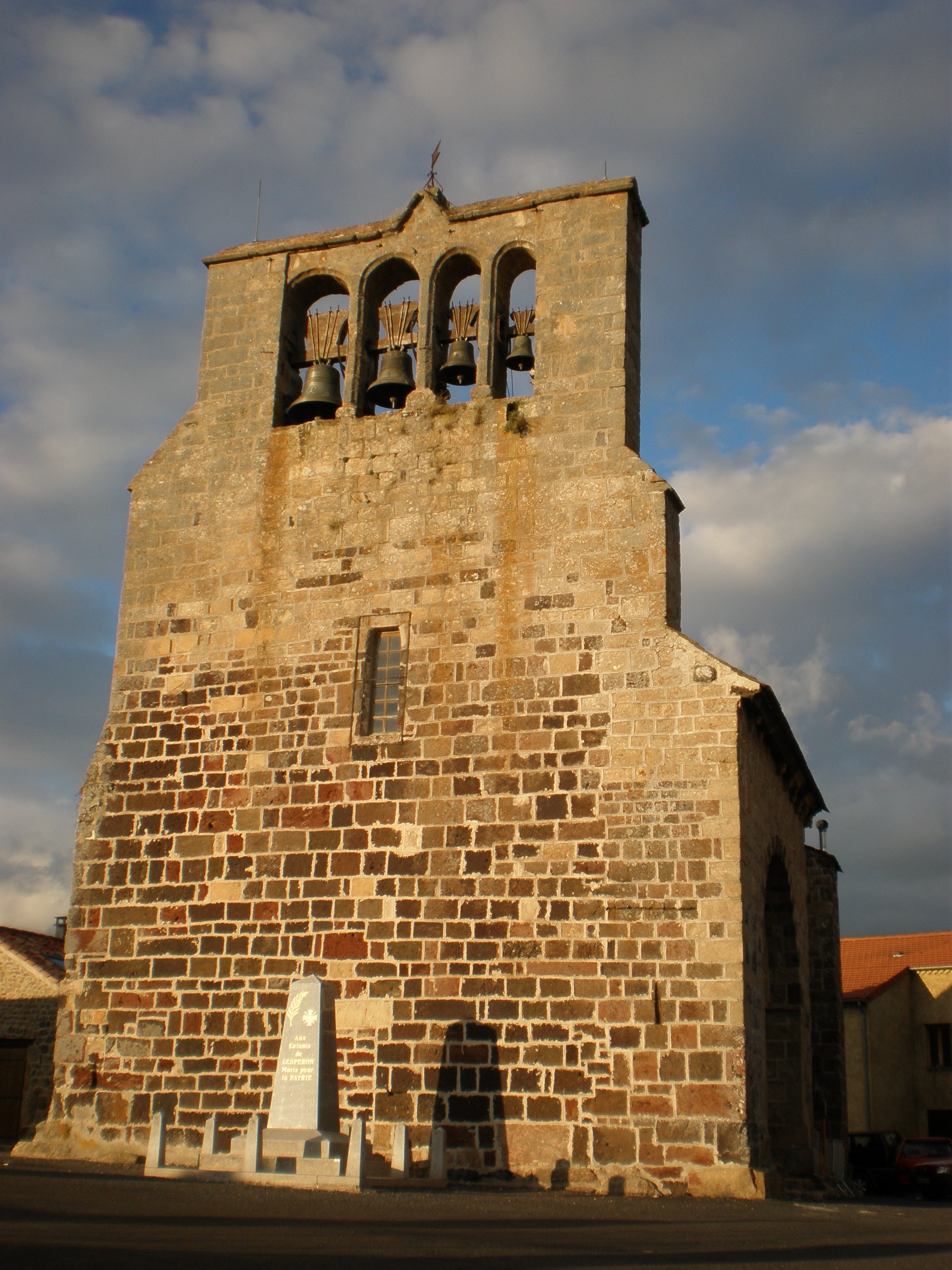
- The church in Lespéron

- Coat of arms
- Location of Lespéron
- Location within France Location within Auvergne-Rhône-Alpes
- Coordinates: 44°43′54″N 3°53′55″E
- Country: France
- Region: Auvergne-Rhône-Alpes
- Department: Ardèche
- Arrondissement: Largentière
- Canton: Haute-Ardèche

Government
  - Mayor (2020–2026): Jean Linossier
- Area^{1}: 24.99 km^{2} (9.65 sq mi)
- Elevation: 1,040 m (3,410 ft)
- Highest elevation: 1,355 m (4,446 ft)
- Lowest elevation: 910 m (2,990 ft)
- Population (2023): 330
  - Density: 13/km^{2} (34/sq mi)
- Time zone: UTC+01:00 (CET)
  - Summer (DST): UTC+02:00 (CEST)
- INSEE/Postal code: 07142 /07660
- ^{1} French Land Register data, which excludes lakes, ponds, glaciers > 1 km^{2} (0.386 sq mi or 247 acres) and river estuaries.

Lespéron (French pronunciation: [lɛspeʁɔ̃]; Occitan: L'Esperon) is a commune in the Ardèche department in southern France.

== Population ==
Historical population
Year	Pop.	±% p.a.
1968	302	—
1975	234	−3.58%
1982	251	+1.01%
1990	239	−0.61%
1999	273	+1.49%
2007	315	+1.80%
2012	317	+0.13%
2017	320	+0.19%
2023	330	+0.51%
Source: INSEE

== See also ==
- Communes of the Ardèche department
