= Coucouron =

- Commune
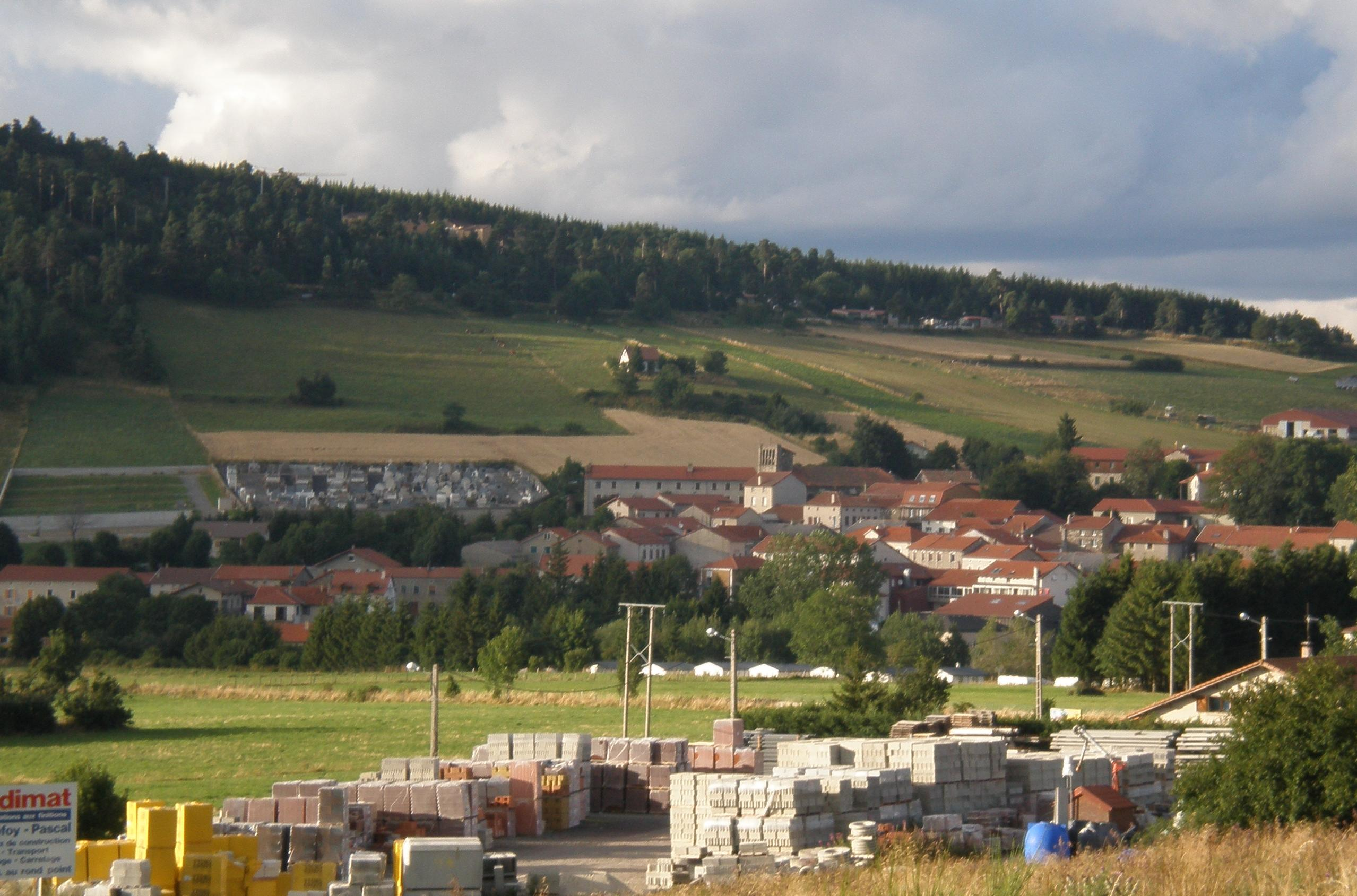
- A general view of Concouron

- Coat of arms
- Location of Coucouron
- Location within France Location within Auvergne-Rhône-Alpes
- Coordinates: 44°48′16″N 3°58′19″E
- Country: France
- Region: Auvergne-Rhône-Alpes
- Department: Ardèche
- Arrondissement: Largentière
- Canton: Haute-Ardèche

Government
  - Mayor (2020–2026): Jacques Genest
- Area^{1}: 23.89 km^{2} (9.22 sq mi)
- Highest elevation: 1,313 m (4,308 ft)
- Lowest elevation: 958 m (3,143 ft)
- Population (2023): 777
  - Density: 32.5/km^{2} (84.2/sq mi)
- Time zone: UTC+01:00 (CET)
  - Summer (DST): UTC+02:00 (CEST)
- INSEE/Postal code: 07071 /07470
- ^{1} French Land Register data, which excludes lakes, ponds, glaciers > 1 km^{2} (0.386 sq mi or 247 acres) and river estuaries.

Coucouron (French pronunciation: [kukuʁɔ̃]; Auvergnat: Cocoron) is a commune in the Ardèche department in southern France.

== See also ==
- Communes of the Ardèche department
