= Le Plagnal =

- Commune
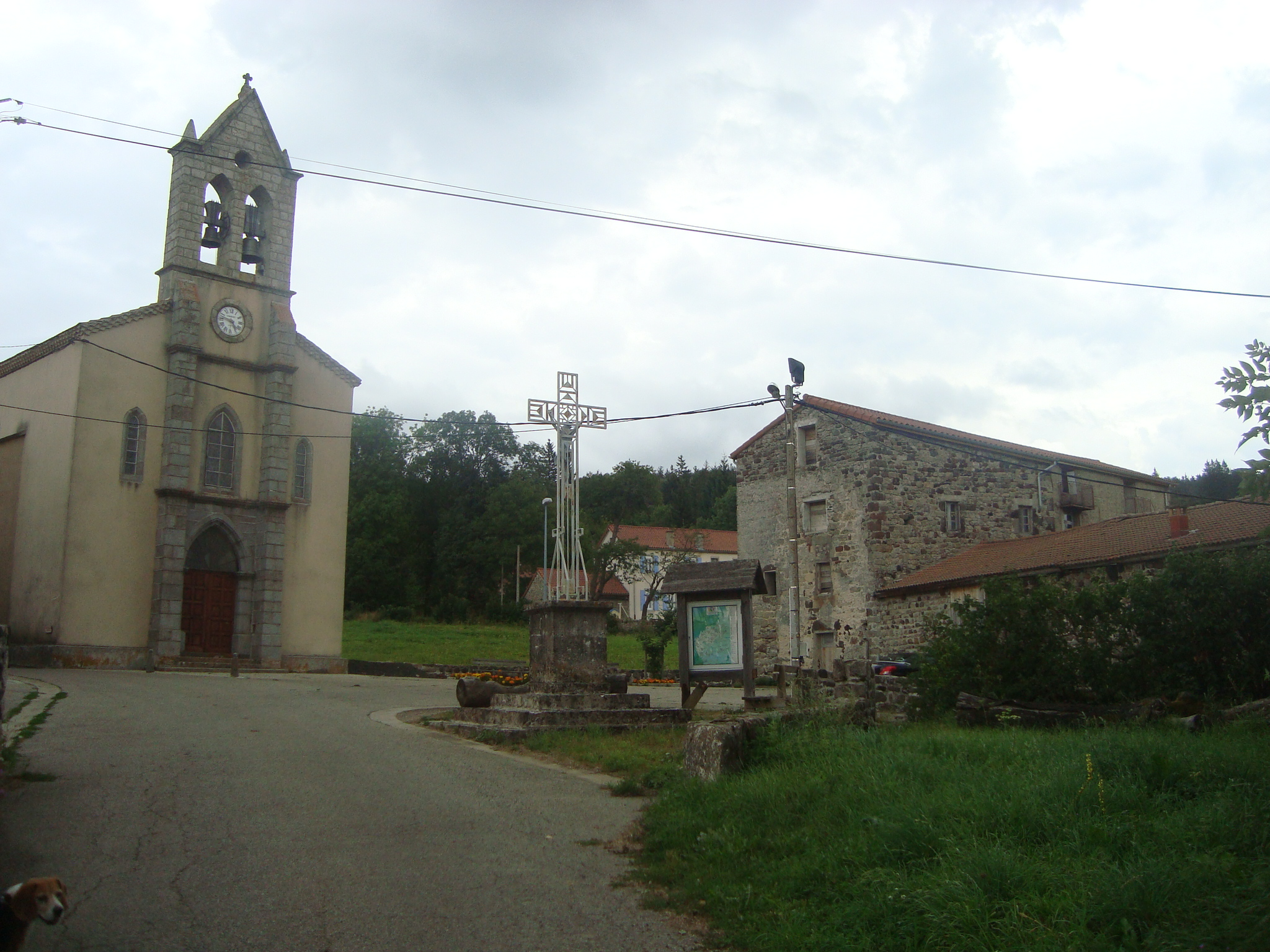
- The church and cross in Le Plagnal
- Location of Le Plagnal
- Location within France Location within Auvergne-Rhône-Alpes
- Coordinates: 44°42′03″N 3°56′46″E
- Country: France
- Region: Auvergne-Rhône-Alpes
- Department: Ardèche
- Arrondissement: Largentière
- Canton: Haute-Ardèche

Government
  - Mayor (2020–2026): Denise Laffarre
- Area^{1}: 16.07 km^{2} (6.20 sq mi)
- Elevation: 1,160 m (3,810 ft)
- Highest elevation: 1,463 m (4,800 ft)
- Lowest elevation: 1,056 m (3,465 ft)
- Population (2023): 66
  - Density: 4.1/km^{2} (11/sq mi)
- Time zone: UTC+01:00 (CET)
  - Summer (DST): UTC+02:00 (CEST)
- INSEE/Postal code: 07175 /07590
- ^{1} French Land Register data, which excludes lakes, ponds, glaciers > 1 km^{2} (0.386 sq mi or 247 acres) and river estuaries.

Le Plagnal (French pronunciation: [lə plaɲal]; Occitan: Lo Planhau) is a commune in the Ardèche department in southern France.

== Population ==
Historical population
Year	Pop.	±% p.a.
1968	104	—
1975	81	−3.51%
1982	69	−2.26%
1990	70	+0.18%
1999	53	−3.04%
2007	72	+3.90%
2012	55	−5.24%
2017	77	+6.96%
2023	66	−2.54%
Source: INSEE

== See also ==
- Communes of the Ardèche department
