= Canton of Haute-Ardèche =

Coordinates: 44.68°N 4.22°E

- Canton
- Situation of the canton of Haute-Ardèche in the department of Ardèche
- Country: France
- Region: Auvergne-Rhône-Alpes
- Department: Ardèche
- No. of communes: {{{nbcomm}}}
- Population (2023): 14,014
- INSEE code: 0713

The canton of Haute-Ardèche (before 2016: canton of Thueyts) is an administrative division of the Ardèche department, southern France. Its borders were modified at the French canton reorganisation which came into effect in March 2015. Its seat is in Thueyts.

It consists of the following communes:

1. Astet
2. Barnas
3. Le Béage
4. Borne
5. Burzet
6. Cellier-du-Luc
7. Chirols
8. Coucouron
9. Cros-de-Géorand
10. Fabras
11. Issanlas
12. Issarlès
13. Jaujac
14. Le Lac-d'Issarlès
15. Lachapelle-Graillouse
16. Lalevade-d'Ardèche
17. Lanarce
18. Laveyrune
19. Lavillatte
20. Lespéron
21. Mayres
22. Mazan-l'Abbaye
23. Meyras
24. Montpezat-sous-Bauzon
25. Péreyres
26. Le Plagnal
27. Pont-de-Labeaume
28. Prades
29. Le Roux
30. Sagnes-et-Goudoulet
31. Saint-Alban-en-Montagne
32. Saint-Cirgues-de-Prades
33. Saint-Cirgues-en-Montagne
34. Sainte-Eulalie
35. Saint-Étienne-de-Lugdarès
36. Saint-Laurent-les-Bains-Laval-d'Aurelle
37. Saint-Pierre-de-Colombier
38. La Souche
39. Thueyts
40. Usclades-et-Rieutord
