= Thueyts =

- Commune
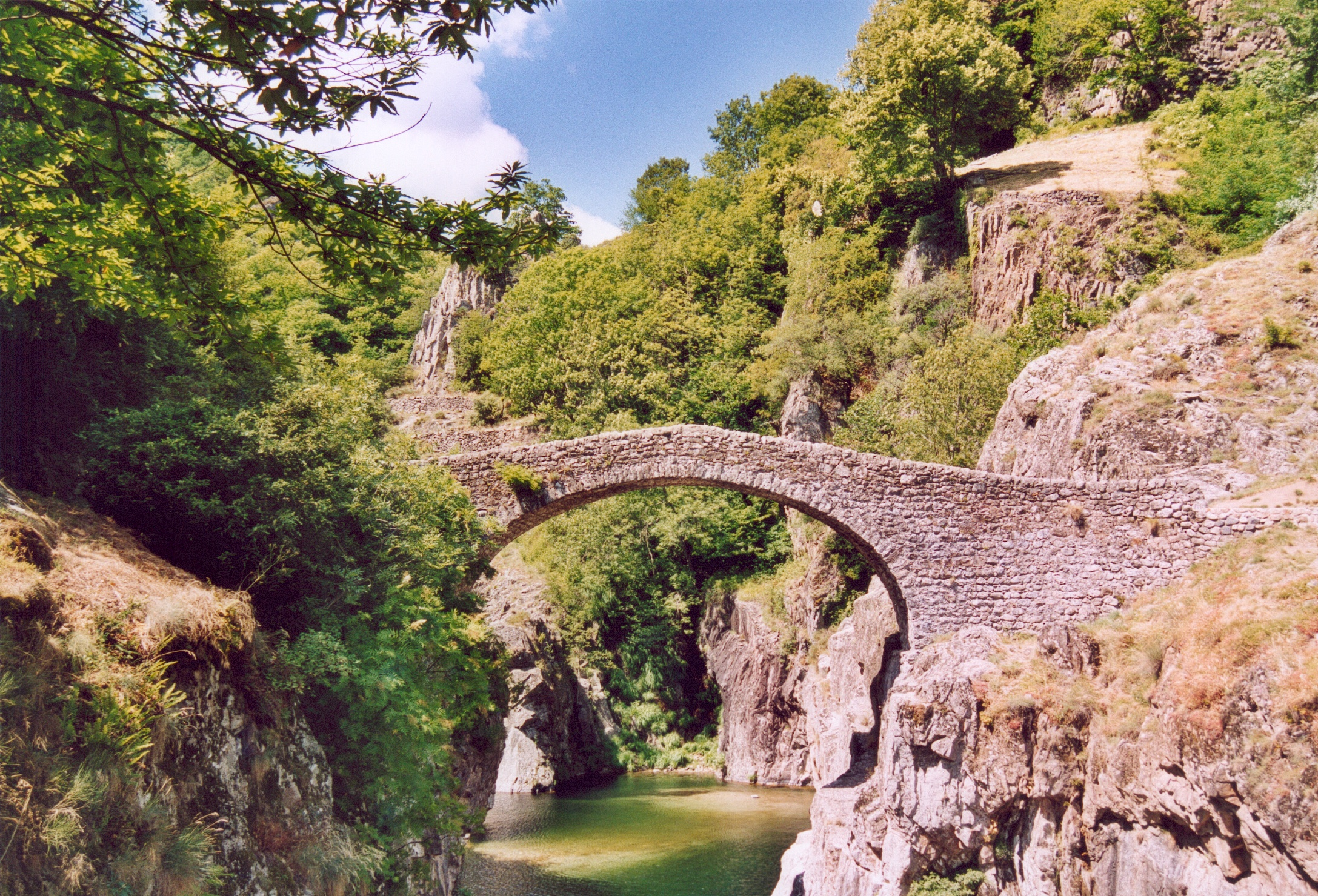
- Devil's Bridge

- Coat of arms
- Location of Thueyts
- Location within France Location within Auvergne-Rhône-Alpes
- Coordinates: 44°40′37″N 4°13′20″E
- Country: France
- Region: Auvergne-Rhône-Alpes
- Department: Ardèche
- Arrondissement: Largentière
- Canton: Haute-Ardèche

Government
  - Mayor (2020–2026): Pierre Chapuis
- Area^{1}: 21.78 km^{2} (8.41 sq mi)
- Elevation: 468 m (1,535 ft)
- Highest elevation: 1,149 m (3,770 ft)
- Lowest elevation: 340 m (1,120 ft)
- Population (2023): 1,205
  - Density: 55.33/km^{2} (143.3/sq mi)
- Time zone: UTC+01:00 (CET)
  - Summer (DST): UTC+02:00 (CEST)
- INSEE/Postal code: 07322 /07330
- ^{1} French Land Register data, which excludes lakes, ponds, glaciers > 1 km^{2} (0.386 sq mi or 247 acres) and river estuaries.

Thueyts (French pronunciation: [tɥɛj]; Occitan: Tuèis) is a commune in the Ardèche department in southern France.

== Population ==
Historical population
Year	Pop.	±% p.a.
1968	981	—
1975	1,035	+0.77%
1982	1,013	−0.31%
1990	945	−0.86%
1999	1,004	+0.68%
2007	1,141	+1.61%
2012	1,230	+1.51%
2017	1,203	−0.44%
2023	1,205	+0.03%
Source: INSEE

== See also ==
- Communes of the Ardèche department
