= Cros-de-Géorand =

- Commune
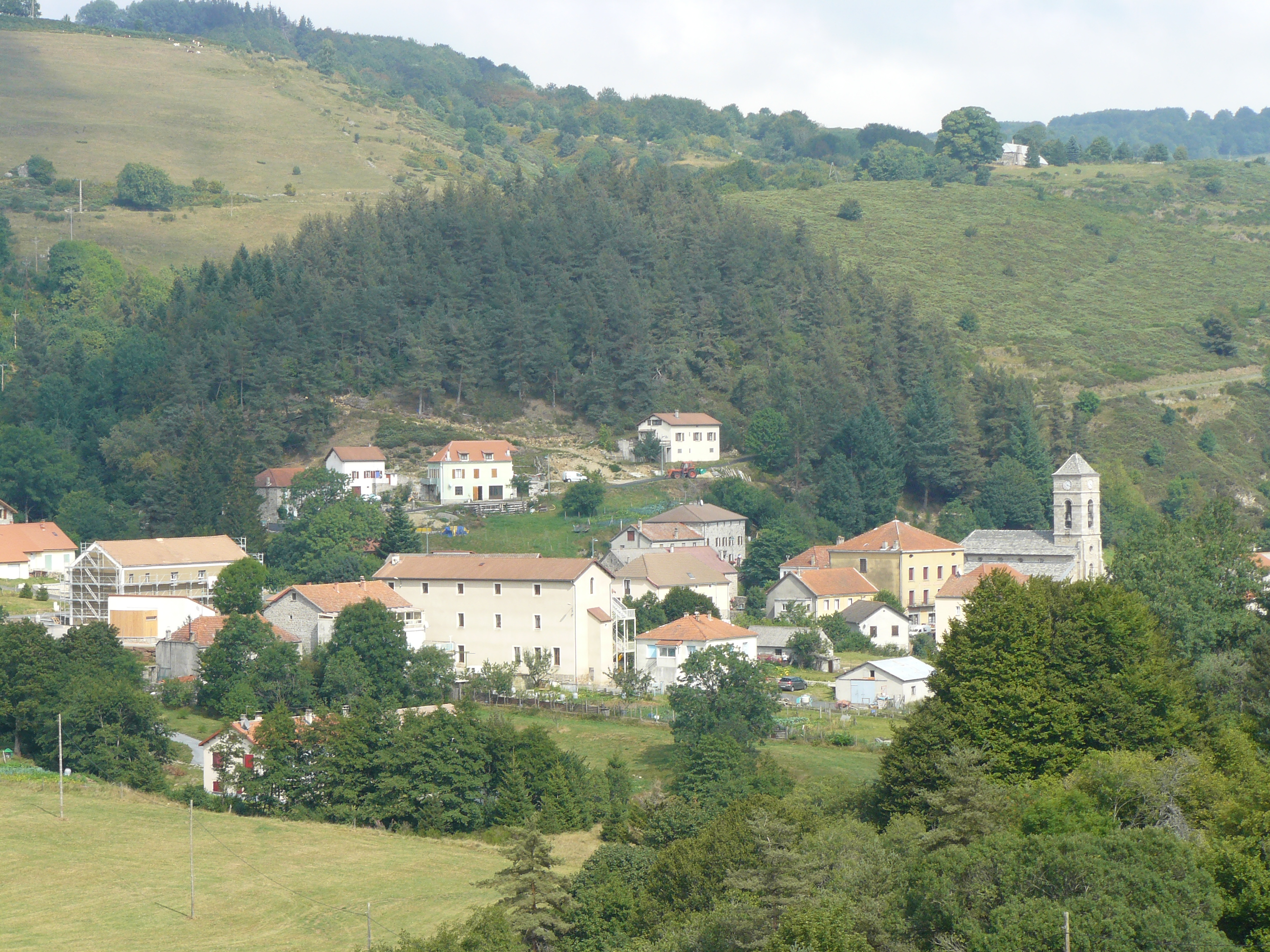
- A general view of Cros-de-Géorand

- Coat of arms
- Location of Cros-de-Géorand
- Location within France Location within Auvergne-Rhône-Alpes
- Coordinates: 44°47′38″N 4°07′36″E
- Country: France
- Region: Auvergne-Rhône-Alpes
- Department: Ardèche
- Arrondissement: Largentière
- Canton: Haute-Ardèche

Government
  - Mayor (2020–2026): Sébastien Pradier
- Area^{1}: 43.39 km^{2} (16.75 sq mi)
- Elevation: 1,029 m (3,376 ft)
- Highest elevation: 1,594 m (5,230 ft)
- Lowest elevation: 916 m (3,005 ft)
- Population (2023): 156
  - Density: 3.60/km^{2} (9.31/sq mi)
- Time zone: UTC+01:00 (CET)
  - Summer (DST): UTC+02:00 (CEST)
- INSEE/Postal code: 07075 /07630
- ^{1} French Land Register data, which excludes lakes, ponds, glaciers > 1 km^{2} (0.386 sq mi or 247 acres) and river estuaries.

Cros-de-Géorand is a commune in the Ardèche department in southern France.

== Population ==
Historical population
| Year | Pop. | ±% p.a. |
|---|---|---|
| 1968 | 436 | — |
| 1975 | 348 | −3.17% |
| 1982 | 303 | −1.96% |
| 1990 | 268 | −1.52% |
| 1999 | 205 | −2.93% |
| 2007 | 186 | −1.21% |
| 2012 | 169 | −1.90% |
| 2017 | 159 | −1.21% |
| 2023 | 156 | −0.32% |
Source: INSEE

== See also ==
- Communes of the Ardèche department
