= Prades, Ardèche =

Prades
- Commune
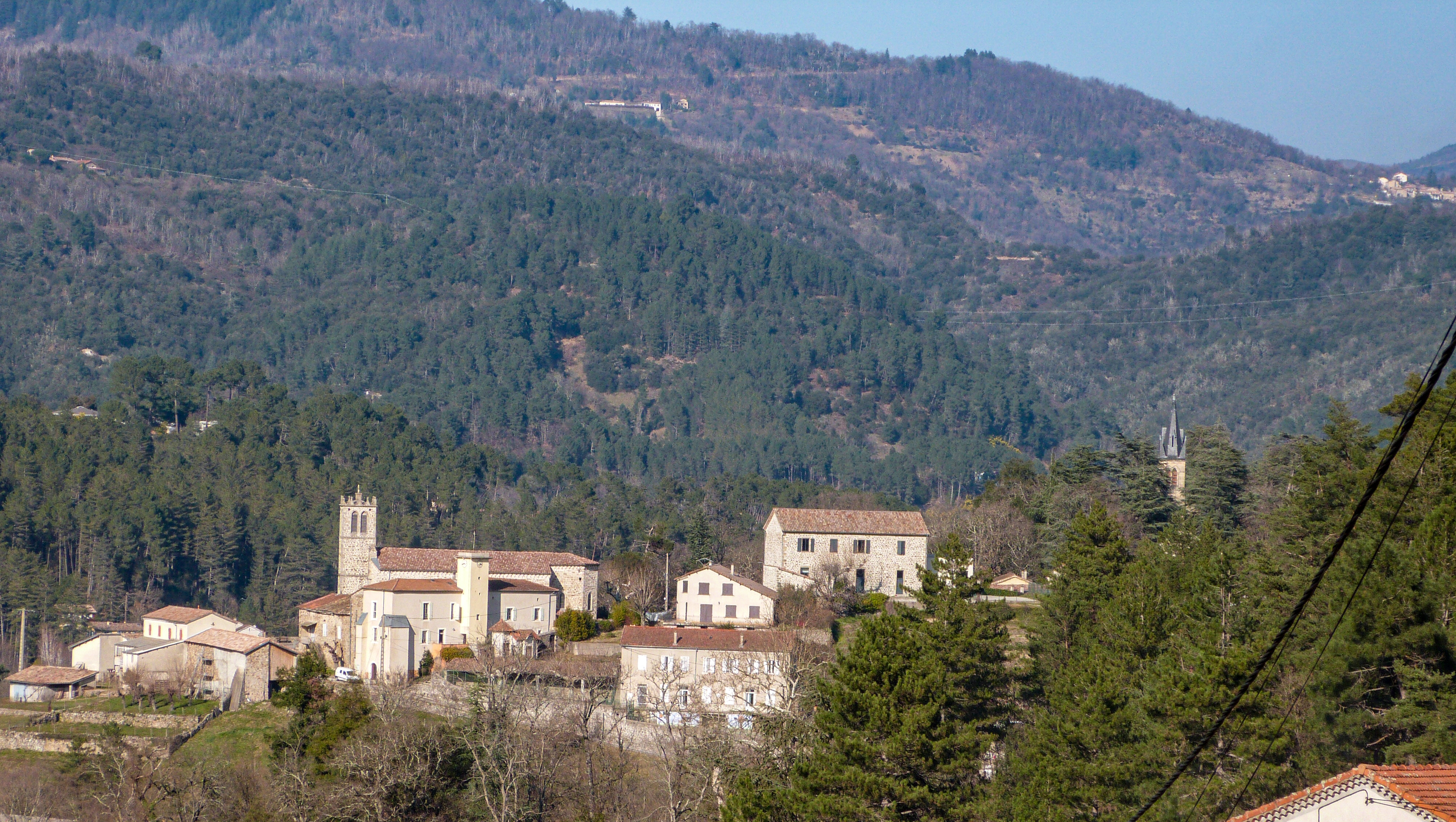
- Prades village, Ardèche.
- Location of Prades
- Location within France Location within Auvergne-Rhône-Alpes
- Coordinates: 44°38′20″N 4°18′53″E
- Country: France
- Region: Auvergne-Rhône-Alpes
- Department: Ardèche
- Arrondissement: Largentière
- Canton: Haute-Ardèche

Government
  - Mayor (2022–2026): Alain Valette
- Area^{1}: 9.79 km^{2} (3.78 sq mi)
- Elevation: 300 m (980 ft)
- Highest elevation: 750 m (2,460 ft)
- Lowest elevation: 243 m (797 ft)
- Population (2023): 1,195
  - Density: 122/km^{2} (316/sq mi)
- Time zone: UTC+01:00 (CET)
  - Summer (DST): UTC+02:00 (CEST)
- INSEE/Postal code: 07182 /07380
- ^{1} French Land Register data, which excludes lakes, ponds, glaciers > 1 km^{2} (0.386 sq mi or 247 acres) and river estuaries.

Prades (French pronunciation: [pʁad]; Occitan: Pradas) is a commune in the Ardèche department in southern France.

== Population ==
Historical population
Year	Pop.	±% p.a.
1968	697	—
1975	770	+1.43%
1982	781	+0.20%
1990	869	+1.34%
1999	887	+0.23%
2007	1,101	+2.74%
2012	1,200	+1.74%
2017	1,213	+0.22%
2023	1,195	−0.25%
Source: INSEE

== See also ==
- Communes of the Ardèche department
