= Saint-Alban-en-Montagne =

- Commune
- Location of Saint-Alban-en-Montagne
- Location within France Location within Auvergne-Rhône-Alpes
- Coordinates: 44°42′21″N 3°54′41″E
- Country: France
- Region: Auvergne-Rhône-Alpes
- Department: Ardèche
- Arrondissement: Largentière
- Canton: Haute-Ardèche

Government
  - Mayor (2020–2026): Claude Brigitte Monceau
- Area^{1}: 13.94 km^{2} (5.38 sq mi)
- Elevation: 1,003 m (3,291 ft)
- Highest elevation: 1,329 m (4,360 ft)
- Lowest elevation: 951 m (3,120 ft)
- Population (2023): 63
  - Density: 4.5/km^{2} (12/sq mi)
- Time zone: UTC+01:00 (CET)
  - Summer (DST): UTC+02:00 (CEST)
- INSEE/Postal code: 07206 /07590
- ^{1} French Land Register data, which excludes lakes, ponds, glaciers > 1 km^{2} (0.386 sq mi or 247 acres) and river estuaries.

Saint-Alban-en-Montagne (French pronunciation: [sɛ̃.t‿albɑ̃ ɑ̃ mɔ̃taɲ], literally Saint-Alban in Mountain; Occitan: Sant Alban de Montanha) is a rural commune in the Ardèche department in southern France.

== Population ==
Historical population
Year	Pop.	±% p.a.
1968	123	—
1975	109	−1.71%
1982	96	−1.80%
1990	80	−2.25%
1999	72	−1.16%
2007	70	−0.35%
2012	74	+1.12%
2017	93	+4.68%
2023	63	−6.28%
Source: INSEE

== See also ==
- Communes of the Ardèche department
