= Le Lac-d'Issarlès =

- Commune
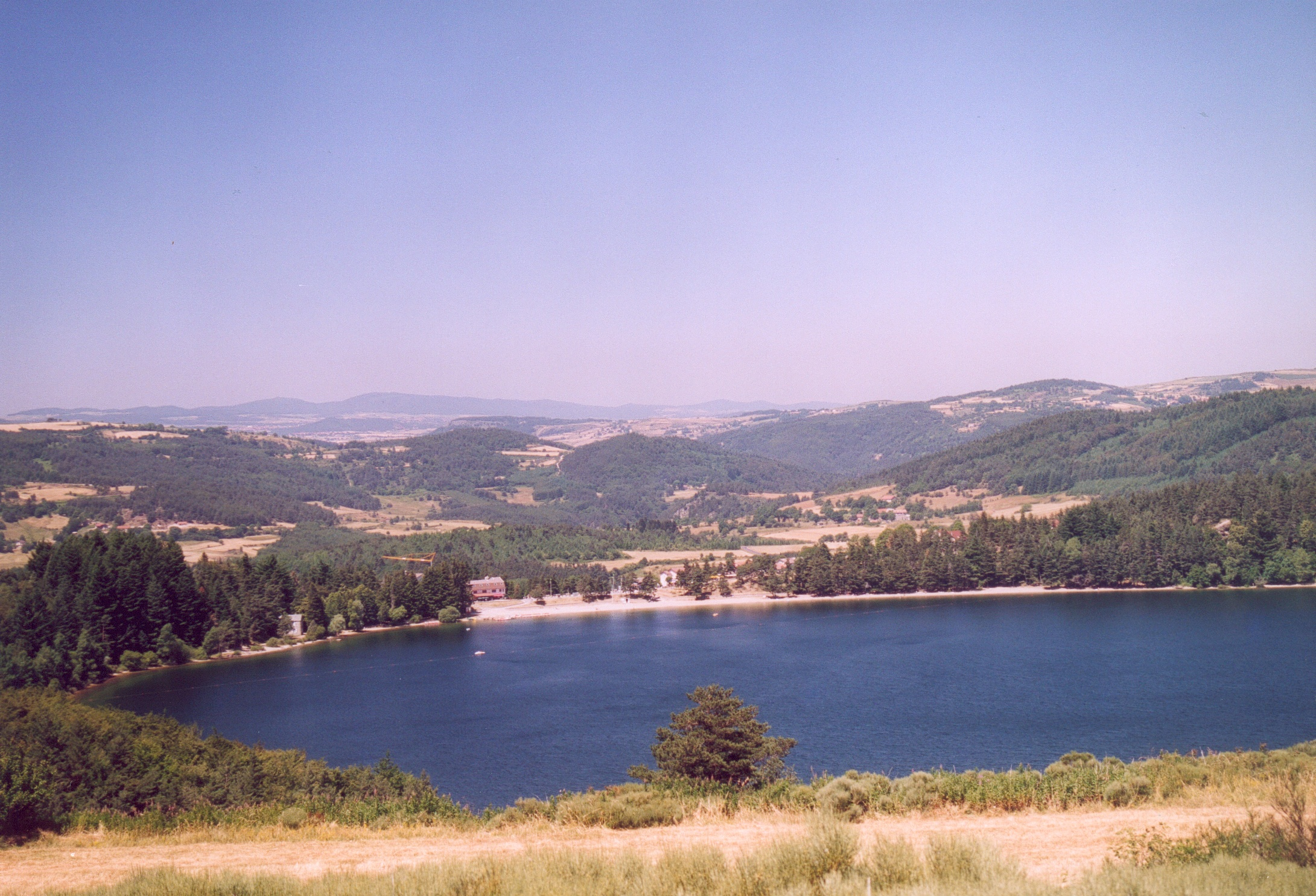
- A general view of the Lac-d'Issarlès
- Location of Le Lac-d'Issarlès
- Location within France Location within Auvergne-Rhône-Alpes
- Coordinates: 44°49′19″N 4°03′40″E
- Country: France
- Region: Auvergne-Rhône-Alpes
- Department: Ardèche
- Arrondissement: Largentière
- Canton: Haute-Ardèche

Government
  - Mayor (2020–2026): Laurence Prevost
- Area^{1}: 14.35 km^{2} (5.54 sq mi)
- Elevation: 997 m (3,271 ft)
- Highest elevation: 1,322 m (4,337 ft)
- Lowest elevation: 874 m (2,867 ft)
- Population (2023): 247
  - Density: 17.2/km^{2} (44.6/sq mi)
- Time zone: UTC+01:00 (CET)
  - Summer (DST): UTC+02:00 (CEST)
- INSEE/Postal code: 07119 /07470
- ^{1} French Land Register data, which excludes lakes, ponds, glaciers > 1 km^{2} (0.386 sq mi or 247 acres) and river estuaries.

Le Lac-d'Issarlès (French pronunciation: [lə lak disaʁlɛs]; Occitan: Lo Lac d'Issarlés) is a commune in the Ardèche department in southern France.

== Population ==
Historical population
Year	Pop.	±% p.a.
1968	253	—
1975	284	+1.66%
1982	290	+0.30%
1990	261	−1.31%
1999	253	−0.35%
2007	265	+0.58%
2012	279	+1.03%
2017	286	+0.50%
2023	247	−2.41%
Source: INSEE

== See also ==
- Communes of the Ardèche department
