= Les Assions =

- Commune
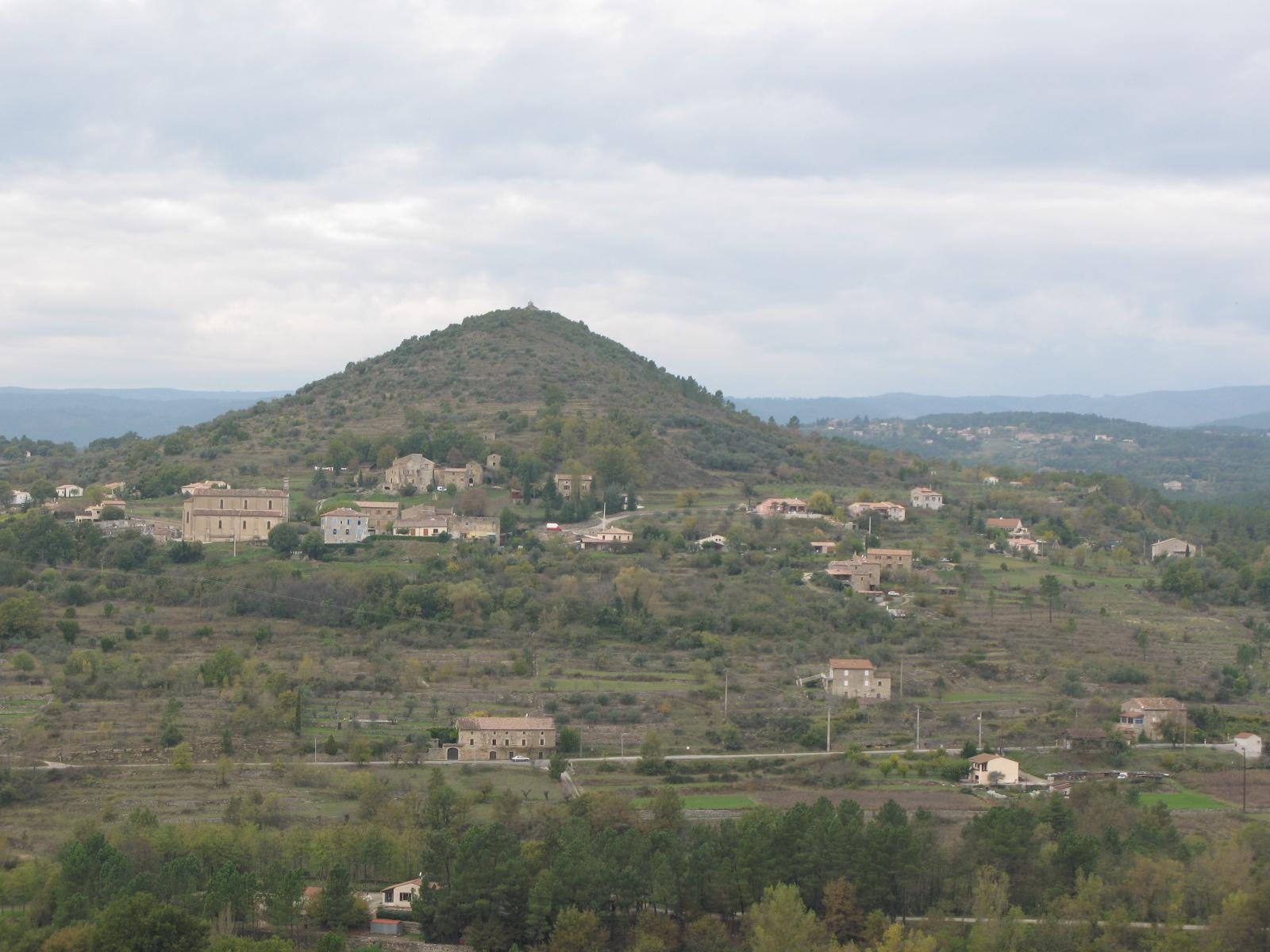
- View of the village at the foot of Puech
- Location of Les Assions
- Location within France Location within Auvergne-Rhône-Alpes
- Coordinates: 44°25′20″N 4°10′28″E
- Country: France
- Region: Auvergne-Rhône-Alpes
- Department: Ardèche
- Arrondissement: Largentière
- Canton: Les Cévennes ardéchoises
- Intercommunality: CC Pays Vans Cévennes

Government
  - Mayor (2020–2026): Emmanuel Legras
- Area^{1}: 14.88 km^{2} (5.75 sq mi)
- Elevation: 200 m (660 ft)
- Highest elevation: 329 m (1,079 ft)
- Lowest elevation: 122 m (400 ft)
- Population (2023): 767
  - Density: 51.5/km^{2} (134/sq mi)
- Time zone: UTC+01:00 (CET)
  - Summer (DST): UTC+02:00 (CEST)
- INSEE/Postal code: 07017 /07140
- ^{1} French Land Register data, which excludes lakes, ponds, glaciers > 1 km^{2} (0.386 sq mi or 247 acres) and river estuaries.

Les Assions is a commune in the Ardèche department in the Auvergne-Rhône-Alpes region of southern France.

== Geography ==
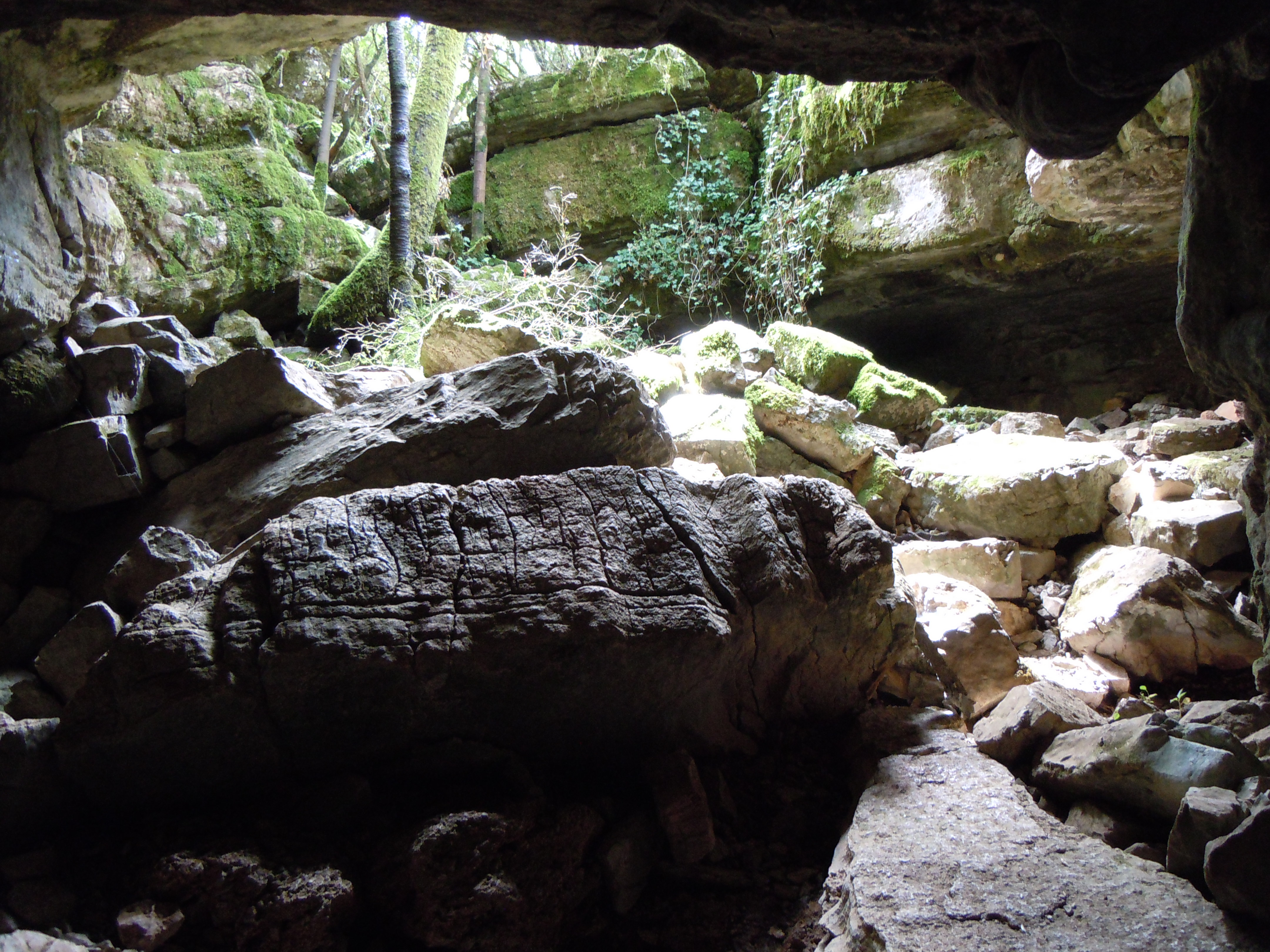
The Saint-Arnault Grotto

Les Assions is located some 35 km south-west of Aubenas and 5 km north-east of Les Vans. Access to the commune is by the D104A road from Lablachère in the north passing through the heart of the commune just east of the village and continuing south to join the D295 near Vompdes. The D452 branches off the D104A in the commune and goes east by a circuitous route to the Village de Vacances Francaises de Casteljau. The D104 from Lablachère to Saint-Paul-le-Jeune forms the eastern border of the commune. Access to the village is by a country road (Le Village) branching north from the D104A in the south of the commune. Apart from the village there are the hamlets of Le Bosc in the west, Le Bourel and La Ribeyrie to the north-east and Champetier-Haut in the north. The commune east of the Salindres river is mostly wasteland and forest while the west side is mostly forest with farmland and residential areas.

The Chassezac river forms the southern border of the commune as it flows east to join the Ardeche at Saint-Alban-Auriolles. The Riviere de Salindres flows south through the commune to join the Chassezac and several other tributaries rise in the commune and flow into the Chassezac.

The vegetation includes predominantly oak trees, olive trees and chestnut trees.

=== Neighbouring communes and villages ===
Source:

== Administration ==
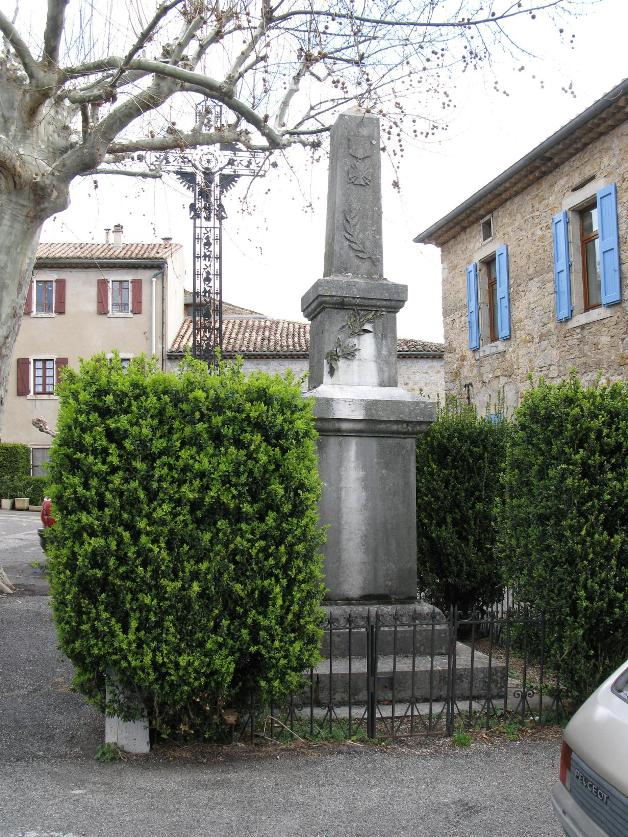
The War Memorial

List of Successive Mayors

| From | To | Name |
|---|---|---|
| 1848 | | Boize |
| | 1995 | Jean Duny |
| 1995 | 2014 | Michel Moutet |
| 2014 | 2020 | Pascal Redon |
| 2020 | current | Emmanuel Legras |

== Demography ==
The inhabitants of the commune are known as Assionais or Assionaises in French.

Historical population

| Year | Pop. | ±% p.a. |
|---|---|---|
| 1793 | 1,178 | — |
| 1800 | 979 | −2.61% |
| 1806 | 1,036 | +0.95% |
| 1821 | 1,042 | +0.04% |
| 1831 | 1,177 | +1.23% |
| 1836 | 1,274 | +1.60% |
| 1841 | 1,357 | +1.27% |
| 1846 | 1,471 | +1.63% |
| 1851 | 1,464 | −0.10% |
| 1856 | 1,424 | −0.55% |
| 1861 | 1,250 | −2.57% |
| 1866 | 1,205 | −0.73% |
| 1872 | 1,240 | +0.48% |
| 1876 | 1,194 | −0.94% |
| 1881 | 1,007 | −3.35% |
| 1886 | 976 | −0.62% |
| 1891 | 972 | −0.08% |
| 1896 | 931 | −0.86% |
| 1901 | 882 | −1.08% |

| Year | Pop. | ±% p.a. |
|---|---|---|
| 1906 | 848 | −0.78% |
| 1911 | 779 | −1.68% |
| 1921 | 664 | −1.58% |
| 1926 | 612 | −1.62% |
| 1931 | 593 | −0.63% |
| 1936 | 570 | −0.79% |
| 1946 | 700 | +2.08% |
| 1954 | 444 | −5.53% |
| 1962 | 495 | +1.37% |
| 1968 | 456 | −1.36% |
| 1975 | 402 | −1.78% |
| 1982 | 440 | +1.30% |
| 1990 | 448 | +0.23% |
| 1999 | 529 | +1.86% |
| 2007 | 614 | +1.88% |
| 2012 | 675 | +1.91% |
| 2017 | 740 | +1.86% |
| 2023 | 767 | +0.60% |

Source: EHESS and INSEE

== Sites and monuments ==
- The abandoned village of Cornilhon
- The Clochans on the Plateau des Gras
- The Chapel of Sainte-Apollonie from the 19th century on top of the Puech
- The Church of Saint-Apollinaire, rebuilt in the 17th and 19th centuries on the ruins of a Roman church

The Church of Saint-Apollinaire contains three items that are registered as historical objects:

- Statue: Saint Apollinaire (19th century)
- 2 Processional Crosses (19th century)
- A Bronze Bell (1670)

Gallery

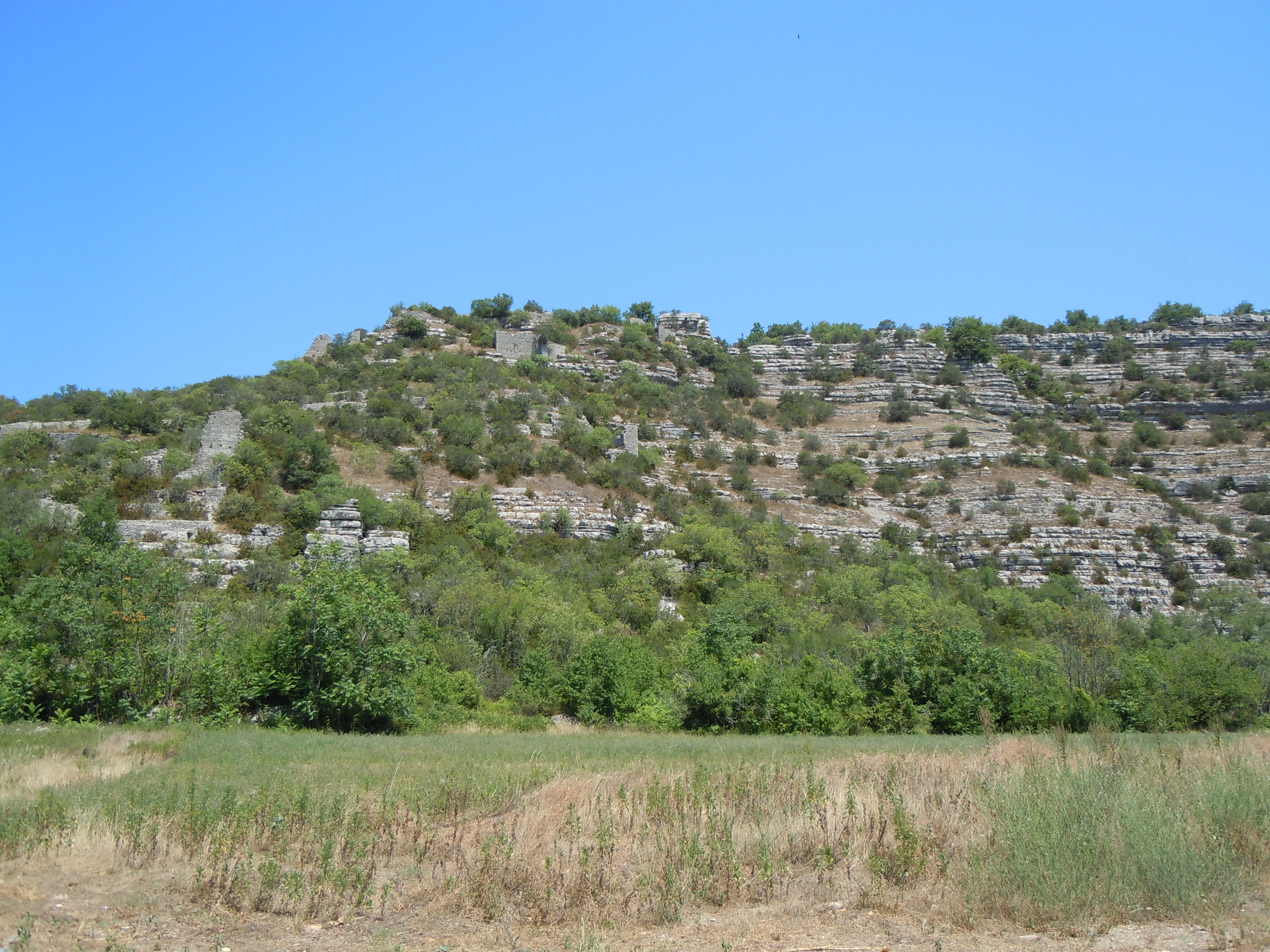
Cornhilon - the abandoned village

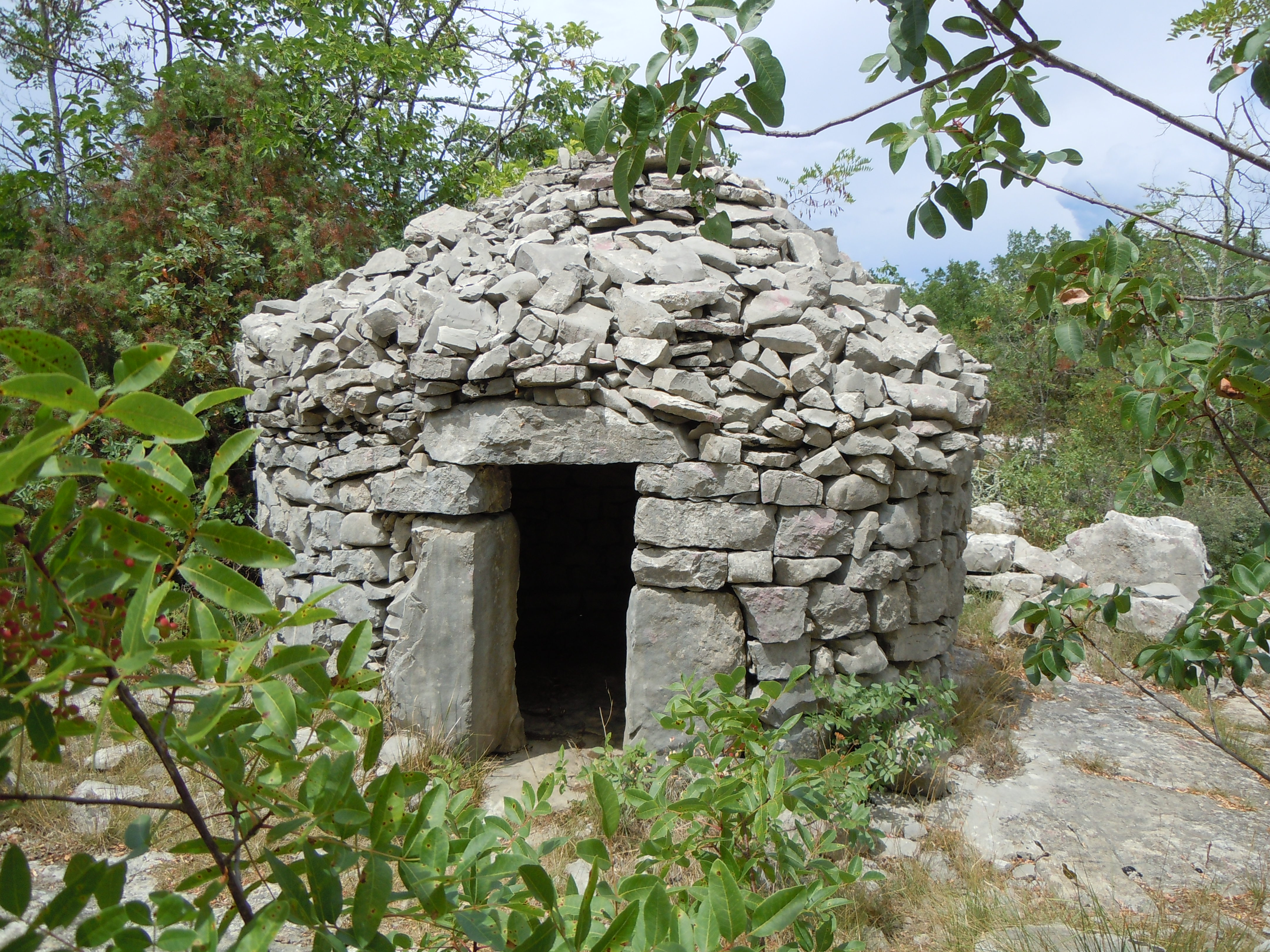
Clochan on the Plateau des Gras

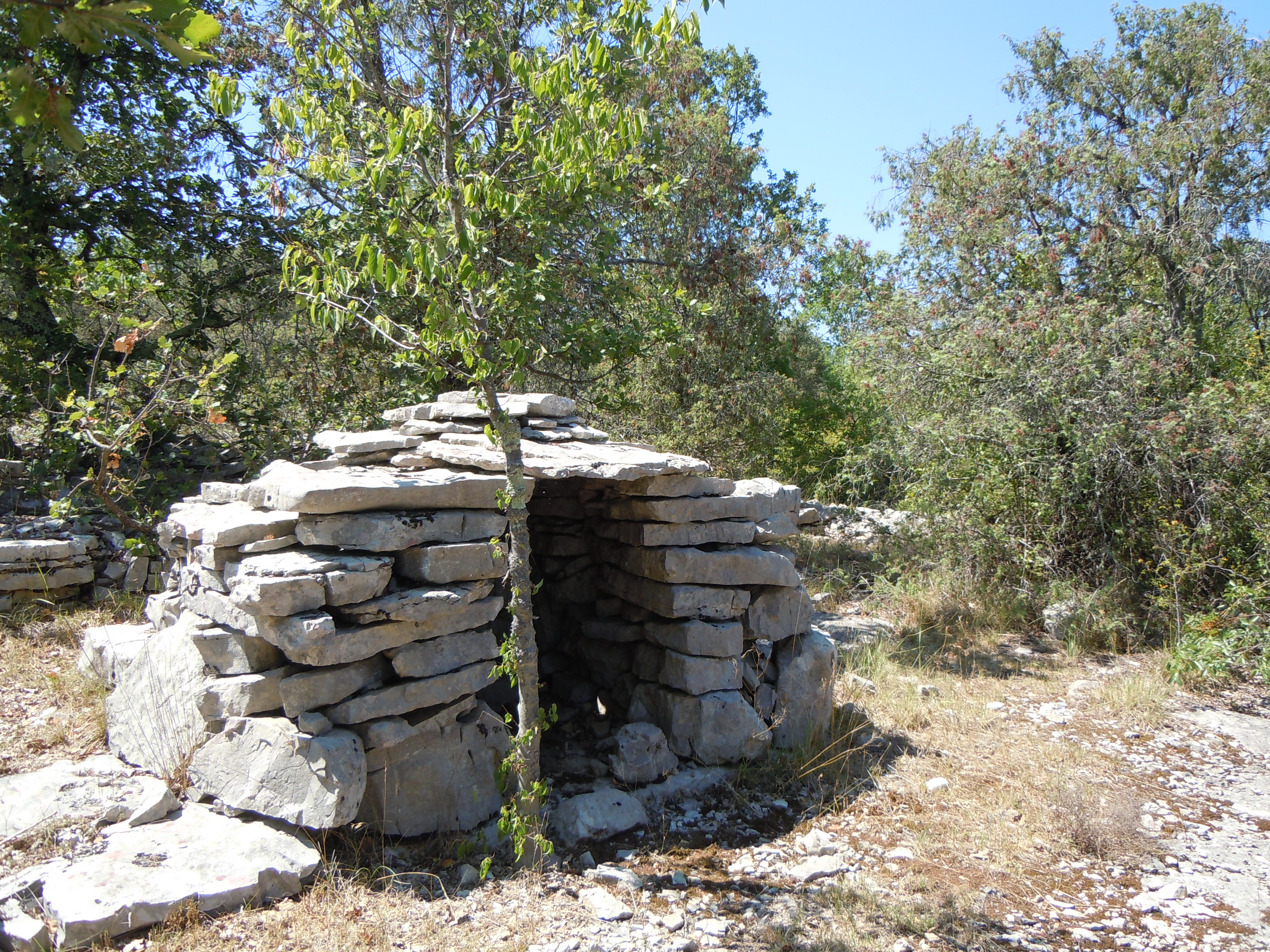
Clochan on the Plateau des Gras

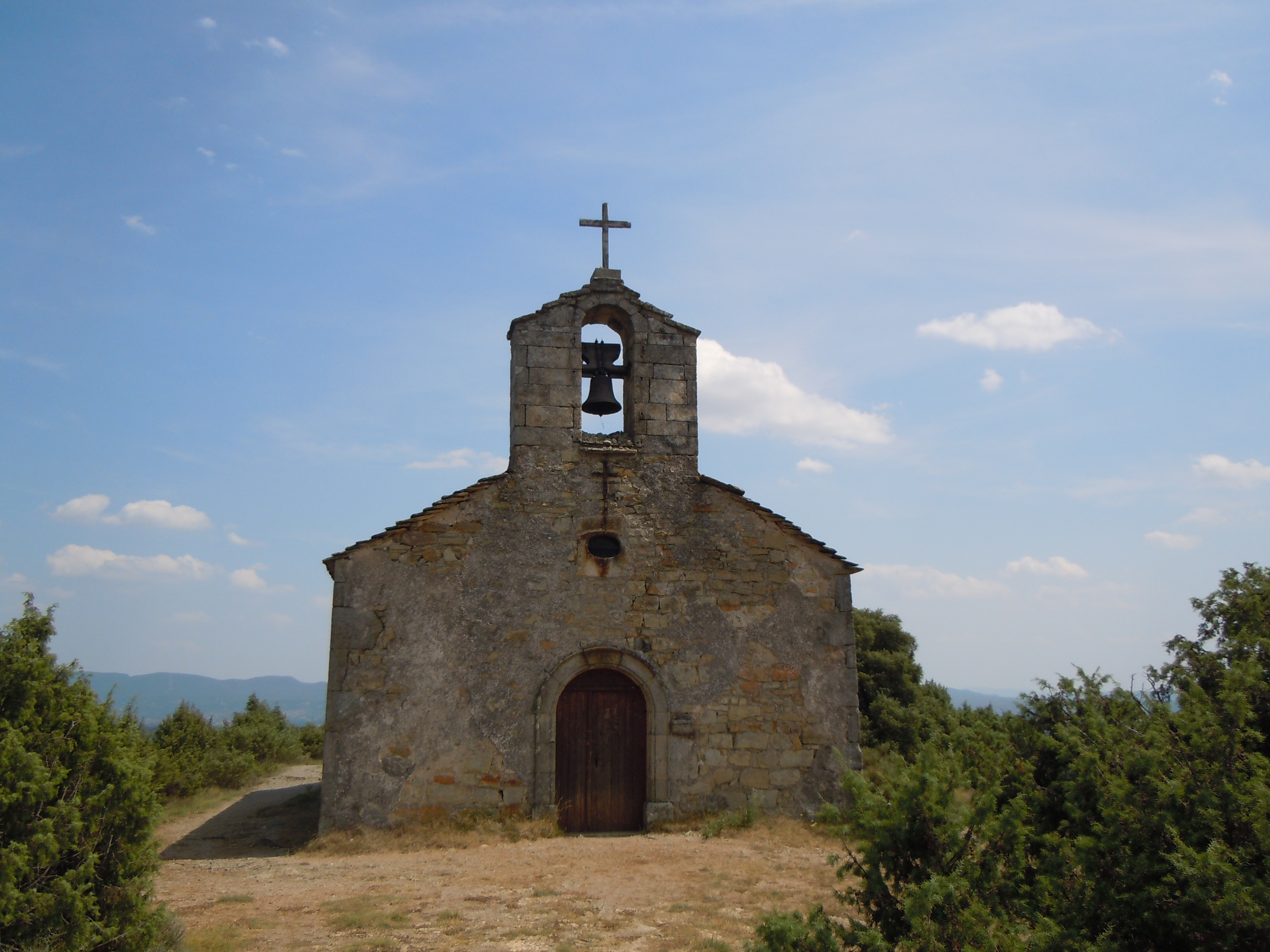
The Chapel of Sainte-Apollonie on the Puech

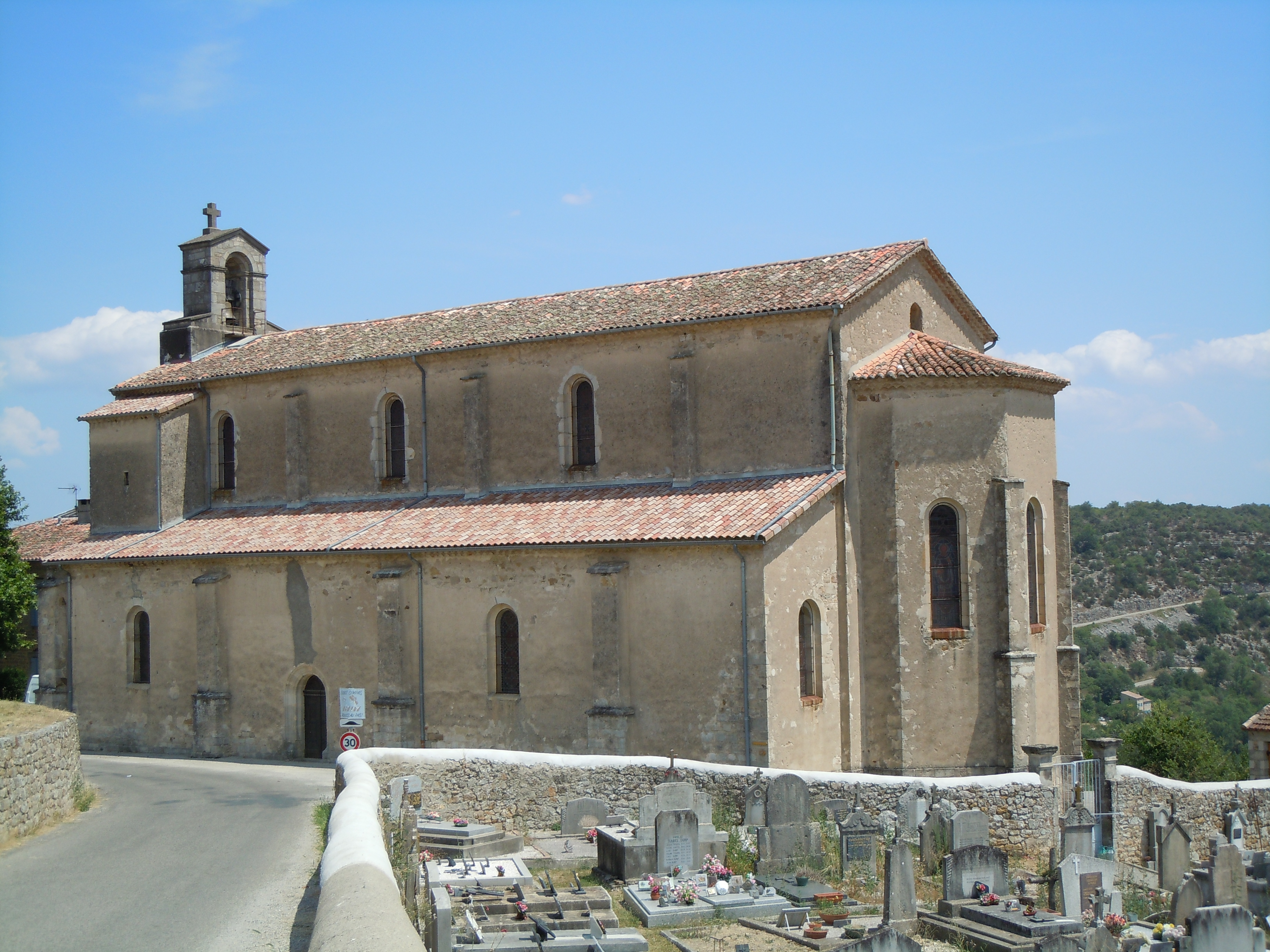
The Church of Saint-Apollinaire

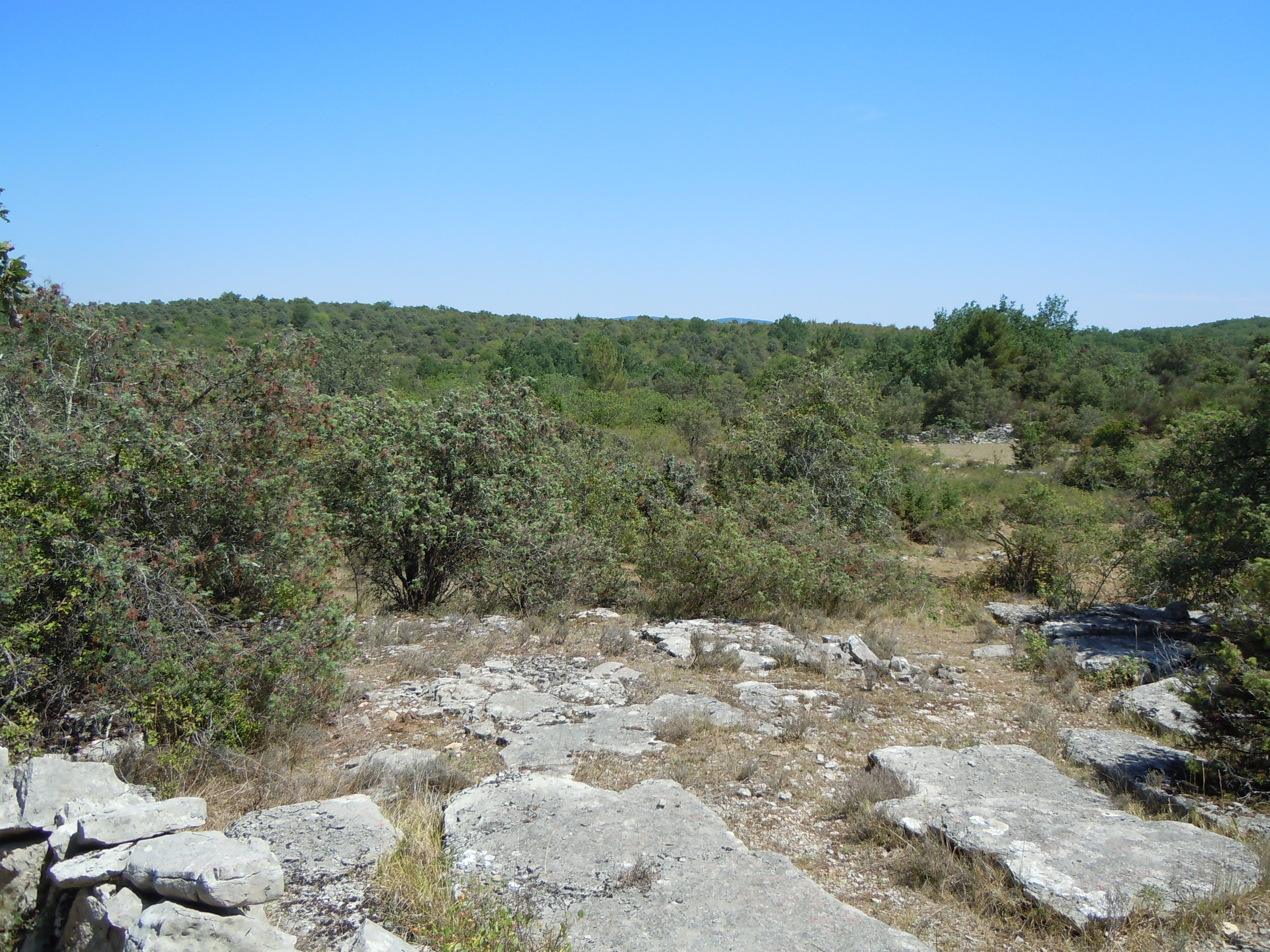
The Plateau des Gras

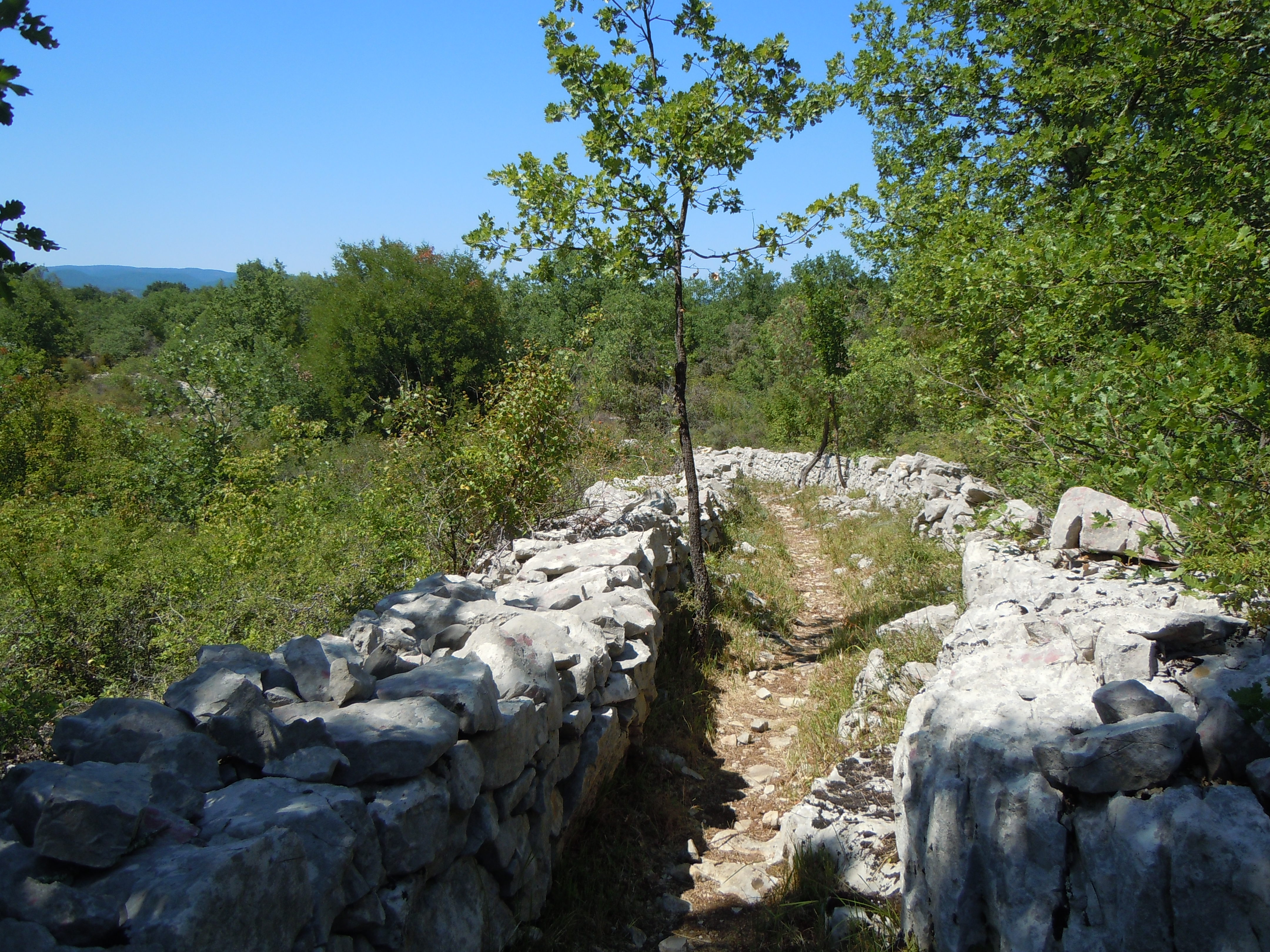
A path on the Plateau des Gras

== See also ==
- Communes of the Ardèche department
