= Faugères =

Faugères may refer to the following places in France:

- Faugères, Ardèche, a commune in the department of Ardèche
- Faugères, Hérault, a commune in the department of Hérault
  - Faugères AOC, an Appellation d'origine contrôlée (AOC) wine from Faugères, Hérault
