= Payzac =

Payzac may refer to:

- Payzac, Ardèche, France
- Payzac, Dordogne, France
