= Montselgues =

- Commune
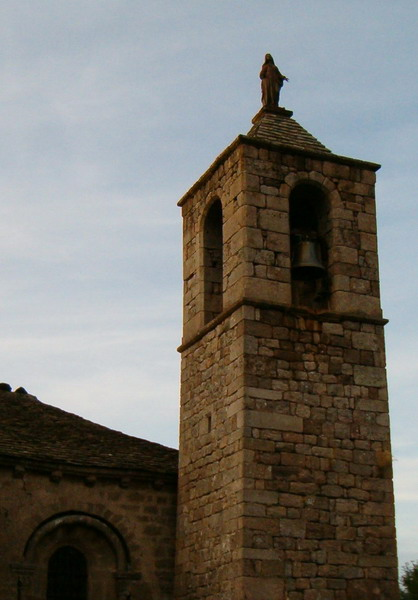
- The church tower in Montselgues
- Location of Montselgues
- Location within France Location within Auvergne-Rhône-Alpes
- Coordinates: 44°31′27″N 4°00′20″E
- Country: France
- Region: Auvergne-Rhône-Alpes
- Department: Ardèche
- Arrondissement: Largentière
- Canton: Les Cévennes ardéchoises

Government
  - Mayor (2020–2026): Joël Fournier
- Area^{1}: 35.87 km^{2} (13.85 sq mi)
- Elevation: 1,000 m (3,300 ft)
- Highest elevation: 1,229 m (4,032 ft)
- Lowest elevation: 355 m (1,165 ft)
- Population (2023): 86
  - Density: 2.4/km^{2} (6.2/sq mi)
- Time zone: UTC+01:00 (CET)
  - Summer (DST): UTC+02:00 (CEST)
- INSEE/Postal code: 07163 /07140
- ^{1} French Land Register data, which excludes lakes, ponds, glaciers > 1 km^{2} (0.386 sq mi or 247 acres) and river estuaries.

Montselgues (French pronunciation: [mɔ̃sɛlɡ]; Occitan: Montselgas) is a commune in the Ardèche department in southern France.

== Population ==
Historical population
Year	Pop.	±% p.a.
1968	113	—
1975	73	−6.05%
1982	80	+1.32%
1990	69	−1.83%
1999	76	+1.08%
2007	91	+2.28%
2012	91	+0.00%
2017	82	−2.06%
2023	86	+0.80%
Source: INSEE

== See also ==
- Communes of the Ardèche department
