= Saint-André-Lachamp =

- Commune
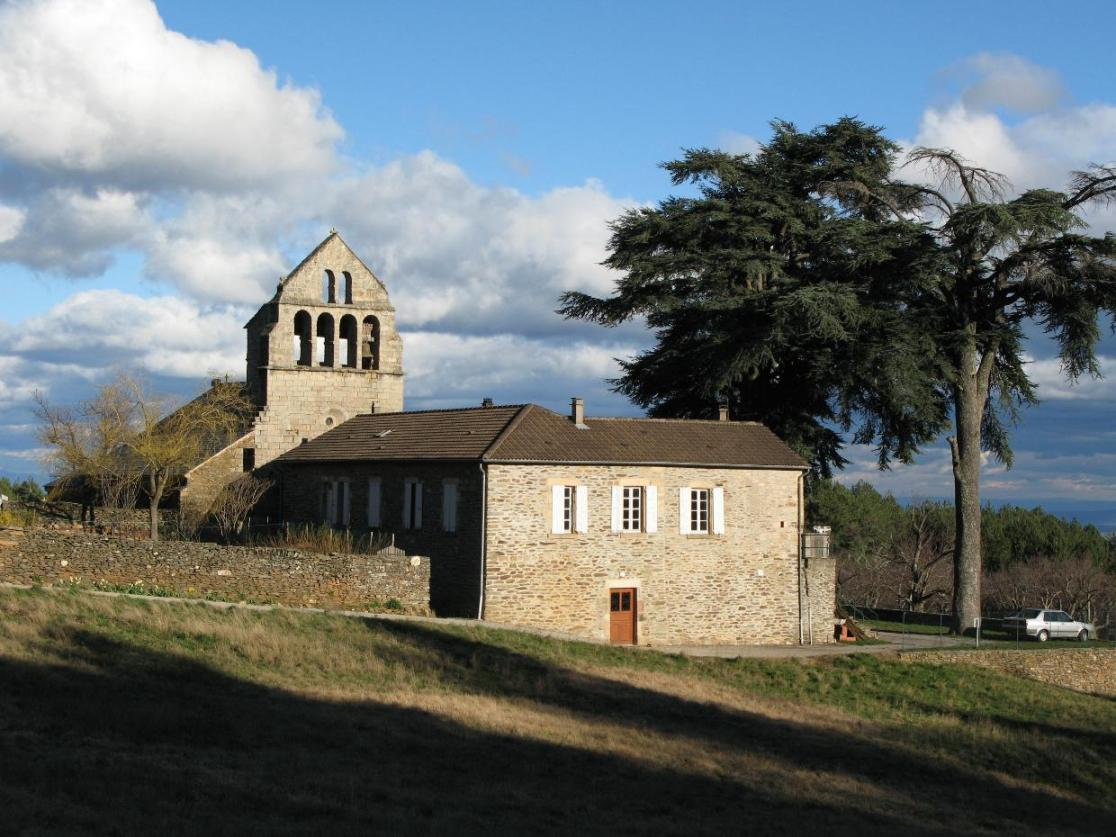
- The church in Saint-André-Lachamp
- Location of Saint-André-Lachamp
- Location within France Location within Auvergne-Rhône-Alpes
- Coordinates: 44°30′21″N 4°09′51″E
- Country: France
- Region: Auvergne-Rhône-Alpes
- Department: Ardèche
- Arrondissement: Largentière
- Canton: Les Cévennes ardéchoises
- Intercommunality: Pays Beaume Drobie

Government
  - Mayor (2020–2026): Luc Parmentier
- Area^{1}: 17.09 km^{2} (6.60 sq mi)
- Elevation: 750 m (2,460 ft)
- Highest elevation: 882 m (2,894 ft)
- Lowest elevation: 220 m (720 ft)
- Population (2023): 167
  - Density: 9.77/km^{2} (25.3/sq mi)
- Time zone: UTC+01:00 (CET)
  - Summer (DST): UTC+02:00 (CEST)
- INSEE/Postal code: 07213 /07230
- ^{1} French Land Register data, which excludes lakes, ponds, glaciers > 1 km^{2} (0.386 sq mi or 247 acres) and river estuaries.

Saint-André-Lachamp (French pronunciation: [sɛ̃.t‿ɑ̃dʁe laʃɑ̃]; Occitan: Sant Andrieu de la Chalm) is a commune in the Ardèche department in southern France.

== Population ==
Historical population
Year	Pop.	±% p.a.
1968	171	—
1975	150	−1.85%
1982	148	−0.19%
1990	157	+0.74%
1999	122	−2.76%
2007	120	−0.21%
2012	147	+4.14%
2017	154	+0.93%
2023	167	+1.36%
Source: INSEE

== See also ==
- Communes of the Ardèche department
