= Saint-Pierre-Saint-Jean =

- Commune
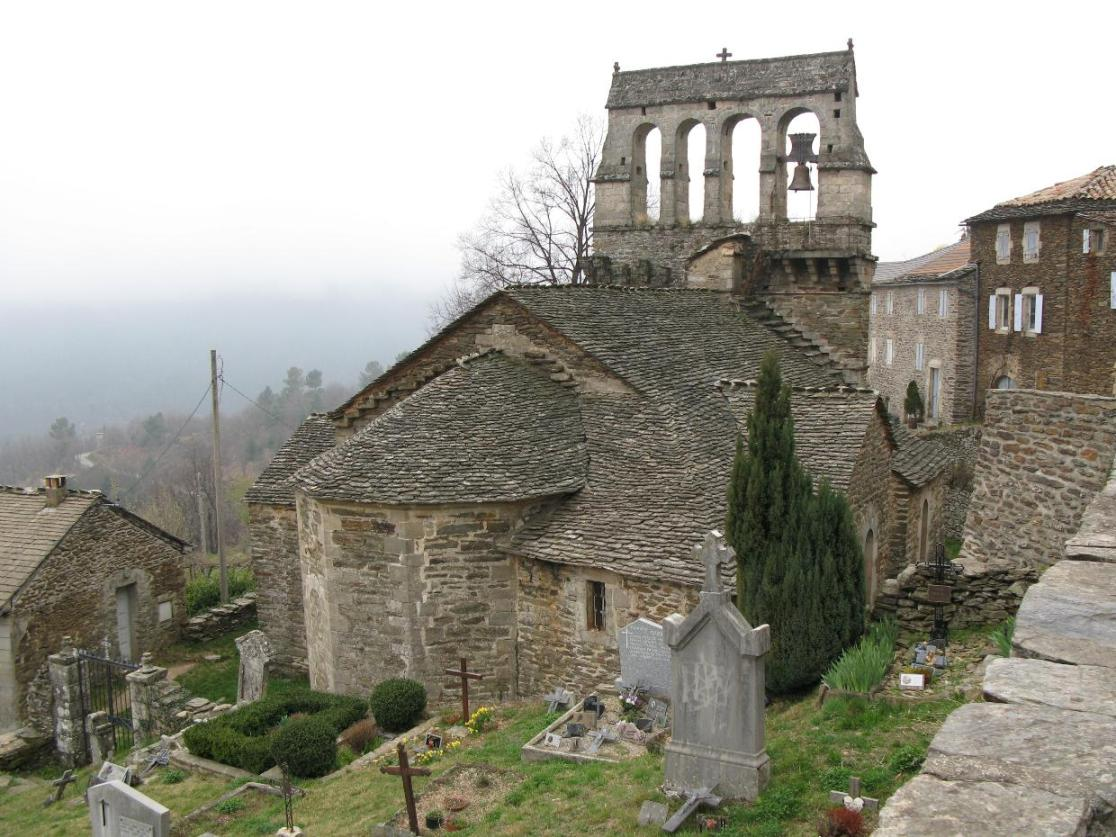
- The church in Saint-Pierre-Saint-Jean
- Location of Saint-Pierre-Saint-Jean
- Location within France Location within Auvergne-Rhône-Alpes
- Coordinates: 44°27′30″N 4°06′28″E
- Country: France
- Region: Auvergne-Rhône-Alpes
- Department: Ardèche
- Arrondissement: Largentière
- Canton: Les Cévennes ardéchoises
- Intercommunality: Pays des Vans en Cévennes

Government
  - Mayor (2020–2026): Bruno Roche
- Area^{1}: 23.62 km^{2} (9.12 sq mi)
- Elevation: 475 m (1,558 ft)
- Highest elevation: 924 m (3,031 ft)
- Lowest elevation: 175 m (574 ft)
- Population (2023): 195
  - Density: 8.26/km^{2} (21.4/sq mi)
- Time zone: UTC+01:00 (CET)
  - Summer (DST): UTC+02:00 (CEST)
- INSEE/Postal code: 07284 /07140
- ^{1} French Land Register data, which excludes lakes, ponds, glaciers > 1 km^{2} (0.386 sq mi or 247 acres) and river estuaries.

Saint-Pierre-Saint-Jean (French pronunciation: [sɛ̃ pjɛʁ sɛ̃ ʒɑ̃]; Occitan: Sant Pèire e Sant Joan) is a commune in the Ardèche department in southern France.

== Population ==
Historical population
Year	Pop.	±% p.a.
1968	181	—
1975	148	−2.83%
1982	136	−1.20%
1990	114	−2.18%
1999	133	+1.73%
2007	156	+2.01%
2012	148	−1.05%
2017	145	−0.41%
2023	195	+5.06%
Source: INSEE

== See also ==
- Communes of the Ardèche department
