= Saint-André-de-Cruzières =

- Commune
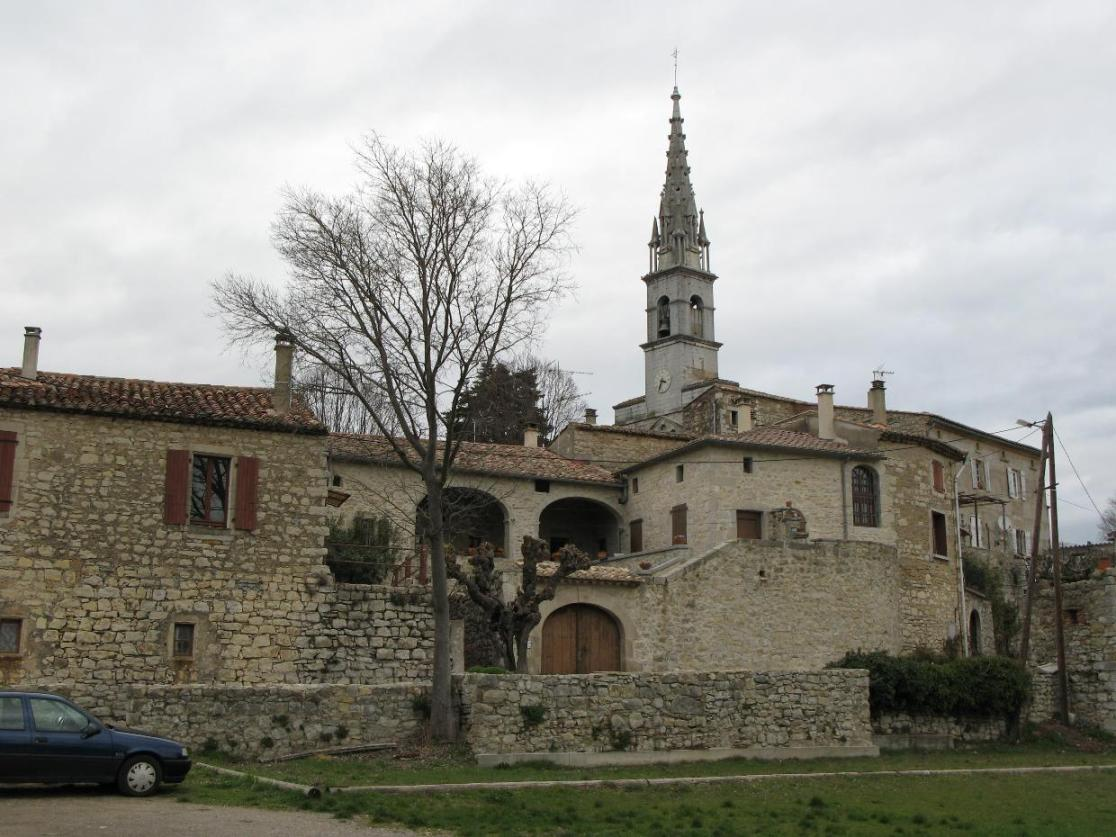
- The church and surrounding buildings in Saint-André-de-Cruzières
- Location of Saint-André-de-Cruzières
- Location within France Location within Auvergne-Rhône-Alpes
- Coordinates: 44°18′56″N 4°13′02″E
- Country: France
- Region: Auvergne-Rhône-Alpes
- Department: Ardèche
- Arrondissement: Largentière
- Canton: Les Cévennes ardéchoises

Government
  - Mayor (2020–2026): Jean-Manuel Garrido
- Area^{1}: 19.81 km^{2} (7.65 sq mi)
- Elevation: 159 m (522 ft)
- Highest elevation: 431 m (1,414 ft)
- Lowest elevation: 152 m (499 ft)
- Population (2023): 467
  - Density: 23.6/km^{2} (61.1/sq mi)
- Time zone: UTC+01:00 (CET)
  - Summer (DST): UTC+02:00 (CEST)
- INSEE/Postal code: 07211 /07460
- ^{1} French Land Register data, which excludes lakes, ponds, glaciers > 1 km^{2} (0.386 sq mi or 247 acres) and river estuaries.

Saint-André-de-Cruzières (French pronunciation: [sɛ̃.t‿ɑ̃dʁe də kʁyzjɛʁ]; Occitan: Sant Andrieu de Crusèiras) is a commune in the Ardèche department in southern France.

== Population ==
Historical population
Year	Pop.	±% p.a.
1968	425	—
1975	403	−0.76%
1982	411	+0.28%
1990	383	−0.88%
1999	415	+0.90%
2007	521	+2.88%
2012	477	−1.75%
2017	464	−0.55%
2023	467	+0.11%
Source: INSEE

== See also ==
- Communes of the Ardèche department
