= Saint-Mélany =

- Commune
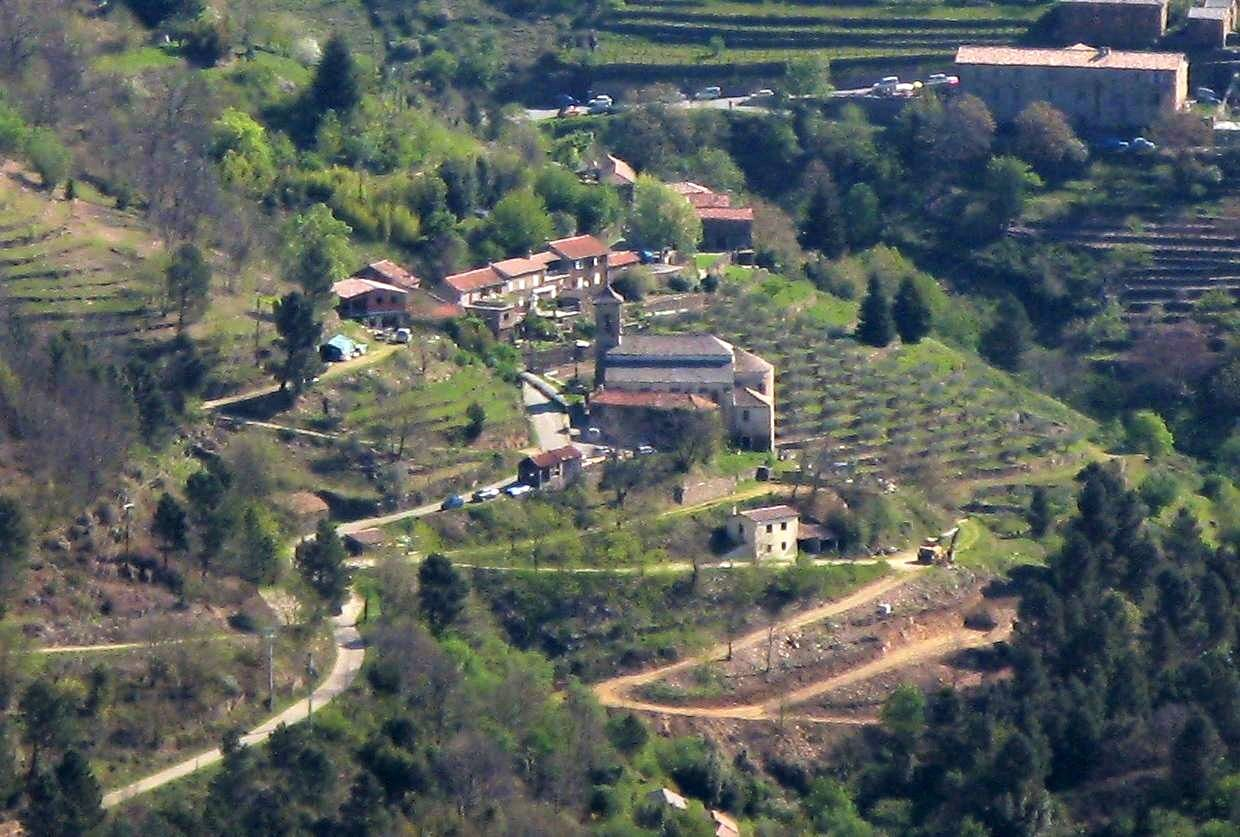
- A general view of Saint-Mélany
- Location of Saint-Mélany
- Location within France Location within Auvergne-Rhône-Alpes
- Coordinates: 44°31′51″N 4°07′09″E
- Country: France
- Region: Auvergne-Rhône-Alpes
- Department: Ardèche
- Arrondissement: Largentière
- Canton: Les Cévennes ardéchoises
- Intercommunality: Pays Beaume Drobie

Government
  - Mayor (2022–2026): Didier Piolat
- Area^{1}: 10.64 km^{2} (4.11 sq mi)
- Elevation: 510 m (1,670 ft)
- Highest elevation: 920 m (3,020 ft)
- Lowest elevation: 275 m (902 ft)
- Population (2023): 118
  - Density: 11.1/km^{2} (28.7/sq mi)
- Time zone: UTC+01:00 (CET)
  - Summer (DST): UTC+02:00 (CEST)
- INSEE/Postal code: 07275 /07260
- ^{1} French Land Register data, which excludes lakes, ponds, glaciers > 1 km^{2} (0.386 sq mi or 247 acres) and river estuaries.

Saint-Mélany (French pronunciation: [sɛ̃ melani]; Occitan: Sant Melani) is a commune in the Ardèche department in the Auvergne-Rhône-Alpes region in southern France.

== Population ==
Historical population
Year	Pop.	±% p.a.
1968	78	—
1975	70	−1.53%
1982	96	+4.62%
1990	98	+0.26%
1999	119	+2.18%
2007	125	+0.62%
2012	121	−0.65%
2017	111	−1.71%
2023	118	+1.02%
Source: INSEE

== See also ==
- Communes of the Ardèche department
