= Rocles, Ardèche =

Rocles
- Commune
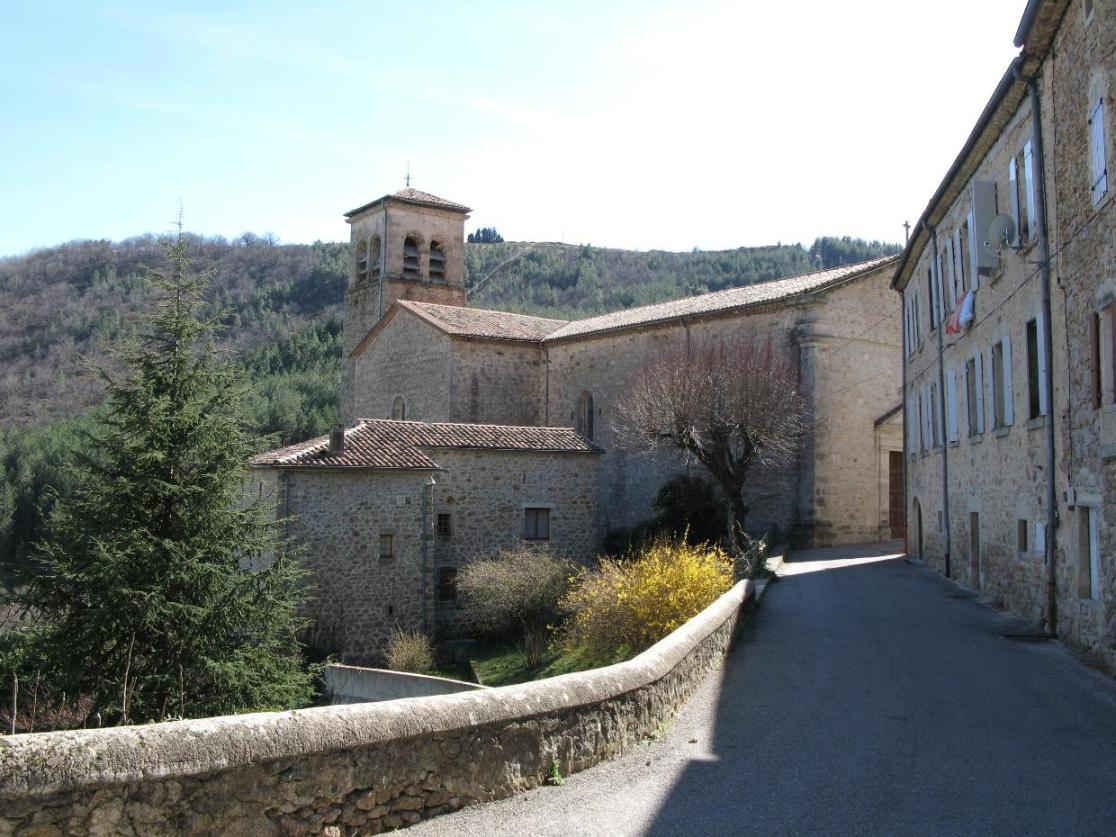
- The church in Rocles
- Location of Rocles
- Location within France Location within Auvergne-Rhône-Alpes
- Coordinates: 44°33′48″N 4°13′00″E
- Country: France
- Region: Auvergne-Rhône-Alpes
- Department: Ardèche
- Arrondissement: Largentière
- Canton: Les Cévennes ardéchoises
- Intercommunality: Pays Beaume Drobie

Government
  - Mayor (2023–2026): Gabriel Pic
- Area^{1}: 16.51 km^{2} (6.37 sq mi)
- Elevation: 500 m (1,600 ft)
- Highest elevation: 1,207 m (3,960 ft)
- Lowest elevation: 270 m (890 ft)
- Population (2023): 261
  - Density: 15.8/km^{2} (40.9/sq mi)
- Time zone: UTC+01:00 (CET)
  - Summer (DST): UTC+02:00 (CEST)
- INSEE/Postal code: 07196 /07110
- ^{1} French Land Register data, which excludes lakes, ponds, glaciers > 1 km^{2} (0.386 sq mi or 247 acres) and river estuaries.

Rocles (French pronunciation: [ʁɔkl]; Occitan: Ròclas) is a commune in the Ardèche department in southern France.

== Population ==
Historical population
Year	Pop.	±% p.a.
1968	253	—
1975	175	−5.13%
1982	181	+0.48%
1990	177	−0.28%
1999	208	+1.81%
2007	206	−0.12%
2012	248	+3.78%
2017	249	+0.08%
2023	261	+0.79%
Source: INSEE

== See also ==
- Communes of the Ardèche department
