= Rosières, Ardèche =

Rosières
- Commune
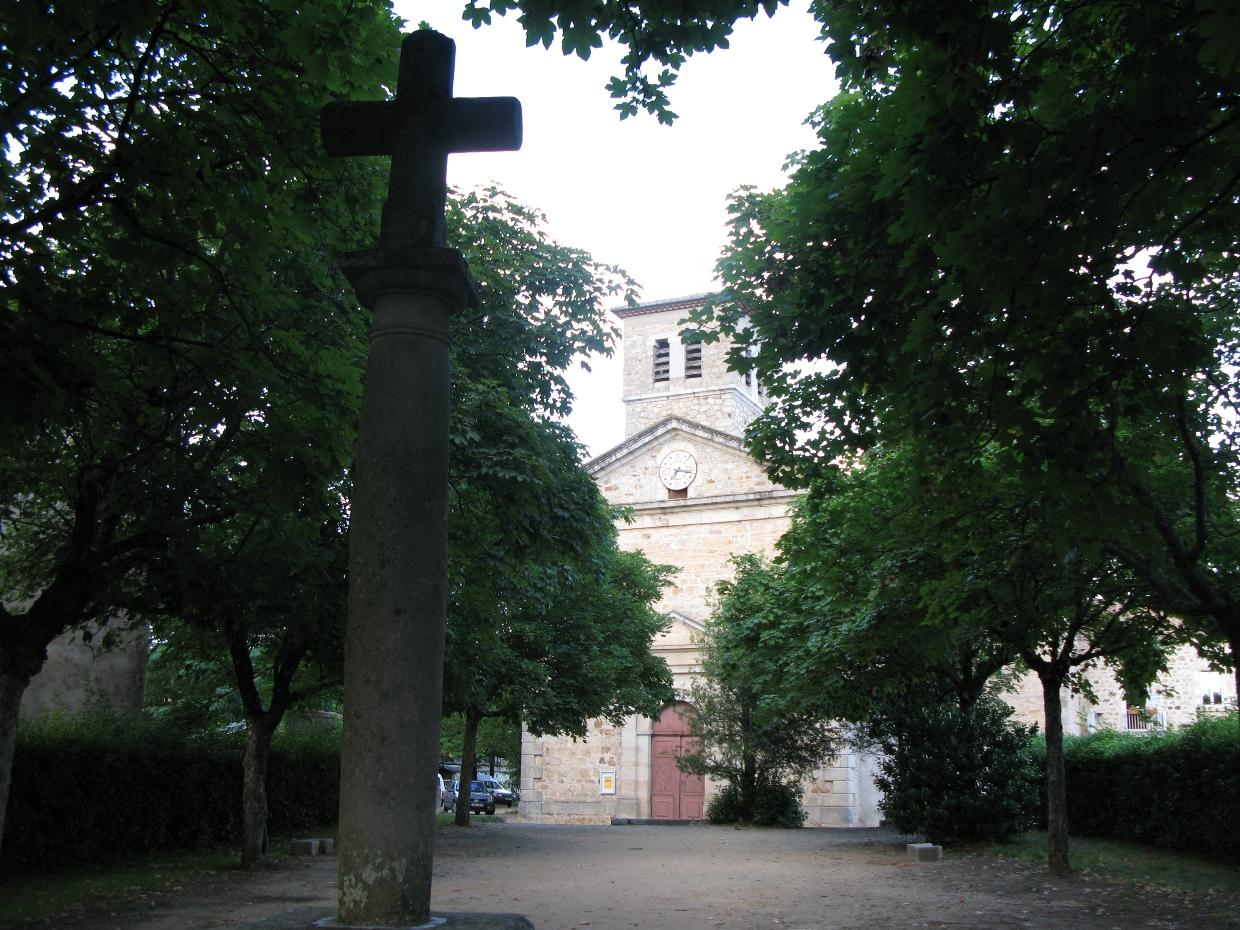
- The church and cross in Rosières
- Location of Rosières
- Location within France Location within Auvergne-Rhône-Alpes
- Coordinates: 44°29′03″N 4°15′29″E
- Country: France
- Region: Auvergne-Rhône-Alpes
- Department: Ardèche
- Arrondissement: Largentière
- Canton: Les Cévennes ardéchoises

Government
  - Mayor (2020–2026): Matthieu Salel
- Area^{1}: 16.29 km^{2} (6.29 sq mi)
- Elevation: 160 m (520 ft)
- Highest elevation: 460 m (1,510 ft)
- Lowest elevation: 120 m (390 ft)
- Population (2023): 1,319
  - Density: 80.97/km^{2} (209.7/sq mi)
- Time zone: UTC+01:00 (CET)
  - Summer (DST): UTC+02:00 (CEST)
- INSEE/Postal code: 07199 /07260
- ^{1} French Land Register data, which excludes lakes, ponds, glaciers > 1 km^{2} (0.386 sq mi or 247 acres) and river estuaries.

Rosières (French pronunciation: [ʁozjɛʁ]; Occitan: Rosèiras) is a commune in the Ardèche department in southern France.

== Population ==
Historical population

Year	Pop.	±% p.a.
1793	750	—
1800	737	−0.25%
1806	978	+4.83%
1821	854	−0.90%
1831	1,618	+6.60%
1836	1,715	+1.17%
1841	1,753	+0.44%
1846	1,781	+0.32%
1851	1,876	+1.04%
1856	1,687	−2.10%
1861	1,510	−2.19%
1866	1,549	+0.51%
1872	1,445	−1.15%
1876	1,408	−0.65%
1881	1,169	−3.65%
1886	1,232	+1.06%
1891	1,291	+0.94%
1896	1,201	−1.43%
1901	1,183	−0.30%

Year	Pop.	±% p.a.
1906	1,183	+0.00%
1911	1,164	−0.32%
1921	1,044	−1.08%
1926	1,015	−0.56%
1931	956	−1.19%
1936	952	−0.08%
1946	847	−1.16%
1954	851	+0.06%
1962	834	−0.25%
1968	786	−0.98%
1975	804	+0.32%
1982	831	+0.47%
1990	911	+1.16%
1999	993	+0.96%
2007	1,077	+1.02%
2012	1,197	+2.14%
2017	1,190	−0.12%
2023	1,319	+1.73%

Source: EHESS and INSEE (1968-2023)

== See also ==
- Communes of the Ardèche department
