= Ribes, Ardèche =

Ribes
- Commune
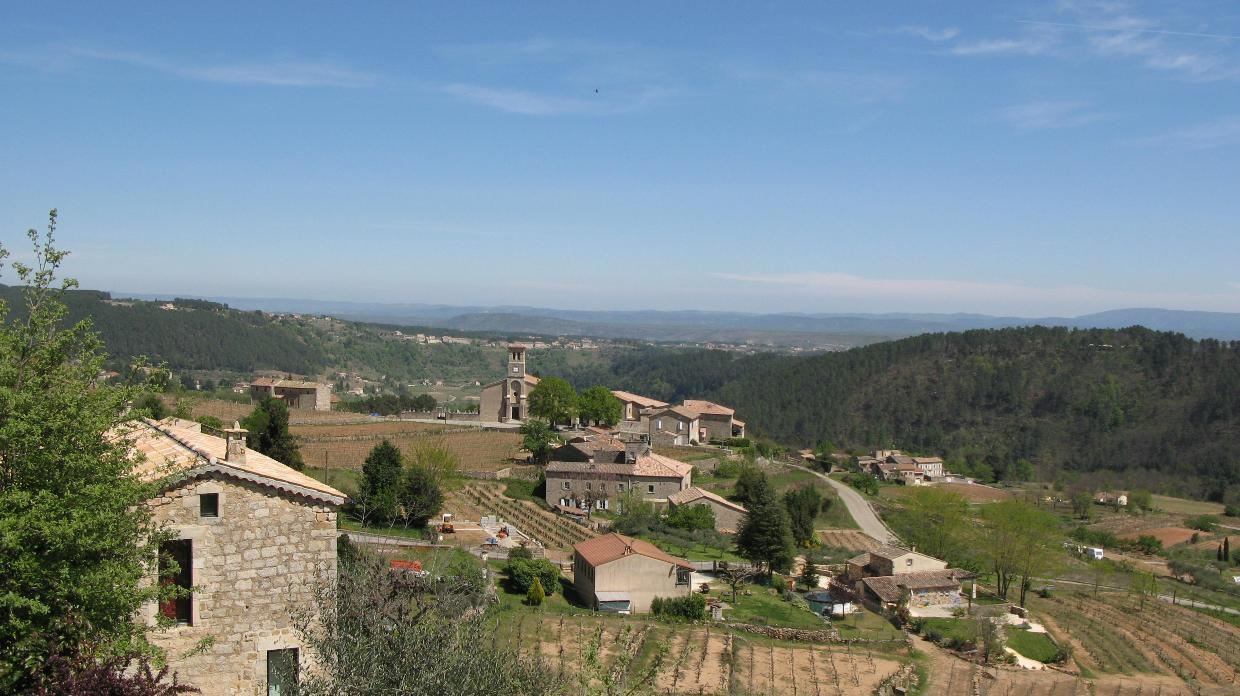
- A general view of Ribes
- Location of Ribes
- Location within France Location within Auvergne-Rhône-Alpes
- Coordinates: 44°29′24″N 4°12′28″E
- Country: France
- Region: Auvergne-Rhône-Alpes
- Department: Ardèche
- Arrondissement: Largentière
- Canton: Les Cévennes ardéchoises
- Intercommunality: Pays Beaume Drobie

Government
  - Mayor (2020–2026): Christian Balazuc
- Area^{1}: 7.17 km^{2} (2.77 sq mi)
- Highest elevation: 680 m (2,230 ft)
- Lowest elevation: 177 m (581 ft)
- Population (2023): 331
  - Density: 46.2/km^{2} (120/sq mi)
- Time zone: UTC+01:00 (CET)
  - Summer (DST): UTC+02:00 (CEST)
- INSEE/Postal code: 07189 /07260
- ^{1} French Land Register data, which excludes lakes, ponds, glaciers > 1 km^{2} (0.386 sq mi or 247 acres) and river estuaries.

Ribes (French pronunciation: [ʁib]; Occitan: Ribas) is a commune in the Ardèche department in southern France.

== Population ==
Historical population
Year	Pop.	±% p.a.
1968	249	—
1975	230	−1.13%
1982	250	+1.20%
1990	309	+2.68%
1999	284	−0.93%
2007	253	−1.43%
2012	272	+1.46%
2017	295	+1.64%
2023	331	+1.94%
Source: INSEE

== See also ==
- Communes of the Ardèche department
