= Beaulieu, Ardèche =

Beaulieu
- Commune
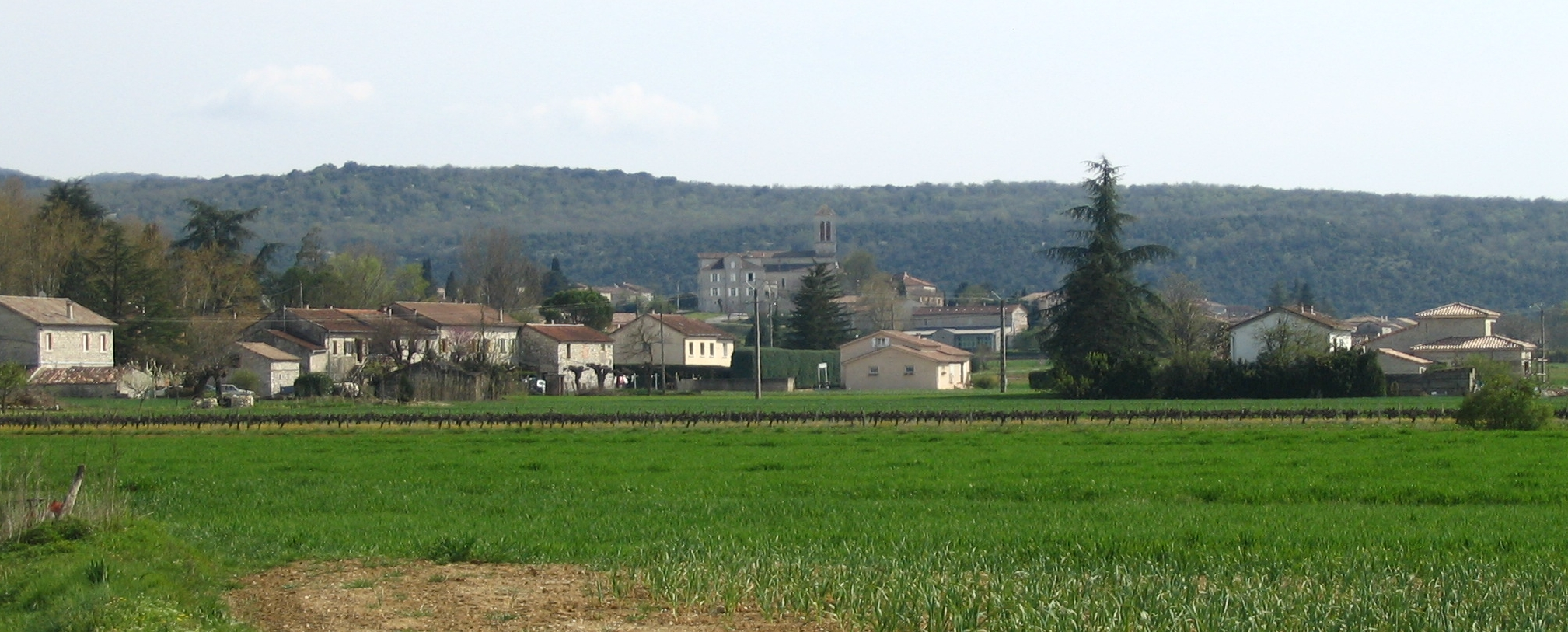
- A panoramic view of Beaulieu

- Coat of arms
- Location of Beaulieu
- Location within France Location within Auvergne-Rhône-Alpes
- Coordinates: 44°21′42″N 4°14′04″E
- Country: France
- Region: Auvergne-Rhône-Alpes
- Department: Ardèche
- Arrondissement: Largentière
- Canton: Les Cévennes ardéchoises

Government
  - Mayor (2020–2026): Jean-François Borie
- Area^{1}: 25.47 km^{2} (9.83 sq mi)
- Elevation: 129 m (423 ft)
- Highest elevation: 471 m (1,545 ft)
- Lowest elevation: 108 m (354 ft)
- Population (2023): 544
  - Density: 21.4/km^{2} (55.3/sq mi)
- Time zone: UTC+01:00 (CET)
  - Summer (DST): UTC+02:00 (CEST)
- INSEE/Postal code: 07028 /07460
- ^{1} French Land Register data, which excludes lakes, ponds, glaciers > 1 km^{2} (0.386 sq mi or 247 acres) and river estuaries.

Beaulieu (French pronunciation: [boljø]; Occitan: Bèl Luòc) is a commune in the Ardèche department in southern France.

== Population ==
Historical population
Year	Pop.	±% p.a.
1968	418	—
1975	417	−0.03%
1982	404	−0.45%
1990	373	−0.99%
1999	400	+0.78%
2007	428	+0.85%
2012	469	+1.85%
2017	498	+1.21%
2023	544	+1.48%
Source: INSEE

== See also ==
- Communes of the Ardèche department
