= Saint-Sauveur-de-Cruzières =

- Commune
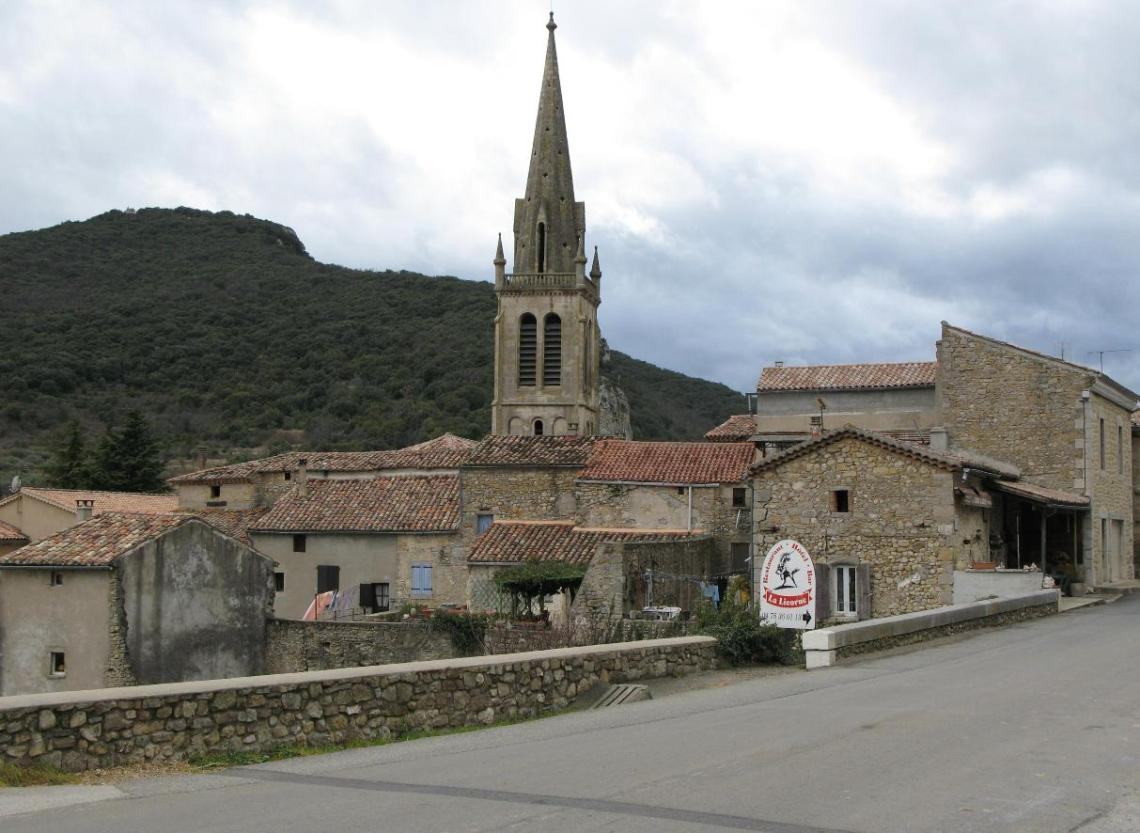
- The church and surrounding buildings in Saint-Sauveur-de-Cruzières
- Location of Saint-Sauveur-de-Cruzières
- Location within France Location within Auvergne-Rhône-Alpes
- Coordinates: 44°18′02″N 4°15′16″E
- Country: France
- Region: Auvergne-Rhône-Alpes
- Department: Ardèche
- Arrondissement: Largentière
- Canton: Les Cévennes ardéchoises

Government
  - Mayor (2020–2026): Christophe Champetier
- Area^{1}: 24.84 km^{2} (9.59 sq mi)
- Elevation: 150 m (490 ft)
- Highest elevation: 448 m (1,470 ft)
- Lowest elevation: 118 m (387 ft)
- Population (2023): 572
  - Density: 23.0/km^{2} (59.6/sq mi)
- Time zone: UTC+01:00 (CET)
  - Summer (DST): UTC+02:00 (CEST)
- INSEE/Postal code: 07294 /07460
- ^{1} French Land Register data, which excludes lakes, ponds, glaciers > 1 km^{2} (0.386 sq mi or 247 acres) and river estuaries.

Saint-Sauveur-de-Cruzières (French pronunciation: [sɛ̃ sovœʁ də kʁyzjɛʁ]; Occitan: Sant Sauvador de Crusèiras) is a commune in the Ardèche department in southern France.

== Population ==
Historical population
Year	Pop.	±% p.a.
1968	431	—
1975	389	−1.45%
1982	409	+0.72%
1990	441	+0.95%
1999	491	+1.20%
2007	533	+1.03%
2012	513	−0.76%
2017	531	+0.69%
2023	572	+1.25%
Source: INSEE

== See also ==
- Communes of the Ardèche department
