= Sablières =

- Commune
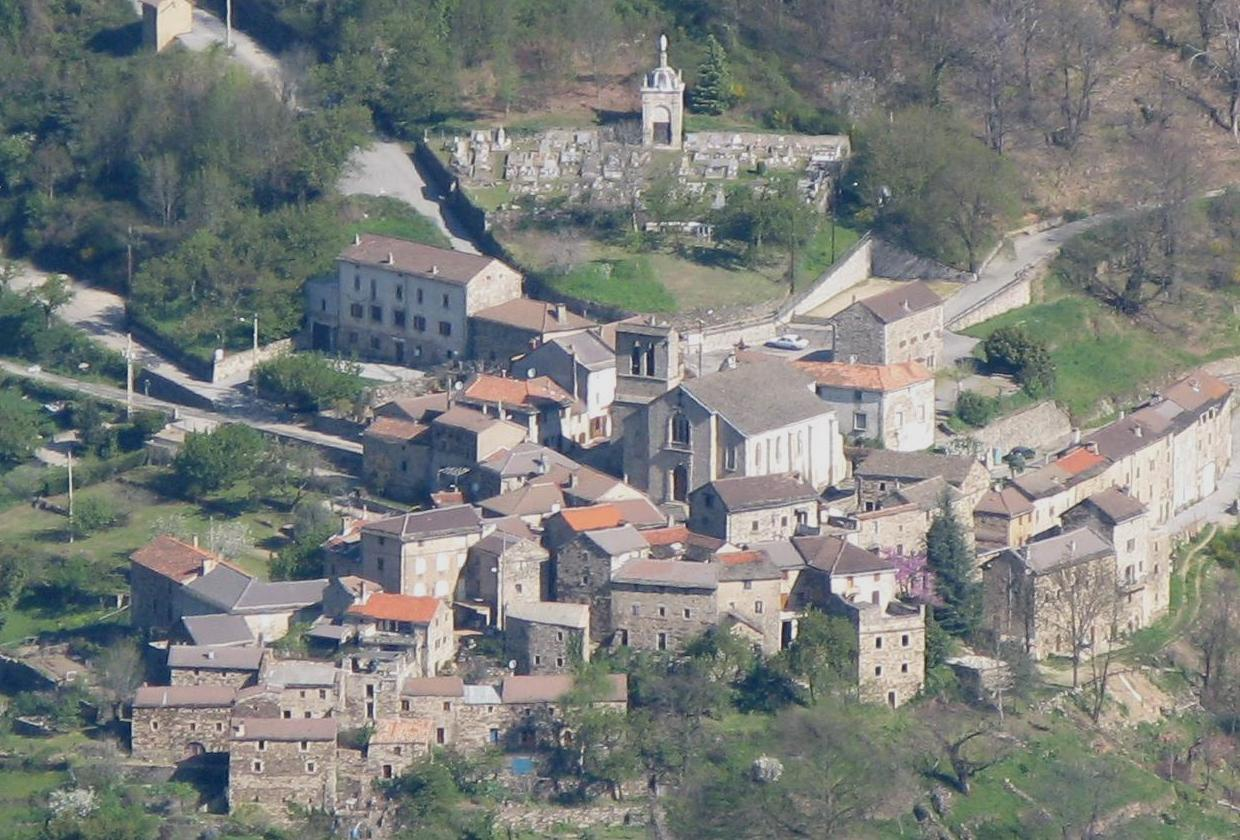
- An aerial view of Sablières
- Location of Sablières
- Location within France Location within Auvergne-Rhône-Alpes
- Coordinates: 44°31′58″N 4°04′31″E
- Country: France
- Region: Auvergne-Rhône-Alpes
- Department: Ardèche
- Arrondissement: Largentière
- Canton: Les Cévennes ardéchoises
- Intercommunality: Pays Beaume-Drobie

Government
  - Mayor (2021–2026): Michel Talagrand
- Area^{1}: 38.98 km^{2} (15.05 sq mi)
- Elevation: 475 m (1,558 ft)
- Highest elevation: 1,261 m (4,137 ft)
- Lowest elevation: 314 m (1,030 ft)
- Population (2023): 166
  - Density: 4.26/km^{2} (11.0/sq mi)
- Time zone: UTC+01:00 (CET)
  - Summer (DST): UTC+02:00 (CEST)
- INSEE/Postal code: 07202 /07260
- ^{1} French Land Register data, which excludes lakes, ponds, glaciers > 1 km^{2} (0.386 sq mi or 247 acres) and river estuaries.

Sablières (French pronunciation: [sablijɛʁ]; Occitan: Sablièras) is a commune in the Ardèche department in southern France.

== Population ==
Historical population
Year	Pop.	±% p.a.
1968	200	—
1975	142	−4.77%
1982	130	−1.25%
1990	149	+1.72%
1999	101	−4.23%
2007	140	+4.17%
2012	137	−0.43%
2017	164	+3.66%
2023	166	+0.20%
Source: INSEE

== See also ==
- Communes of the Ardèche department
