= Laboule =

- Commune
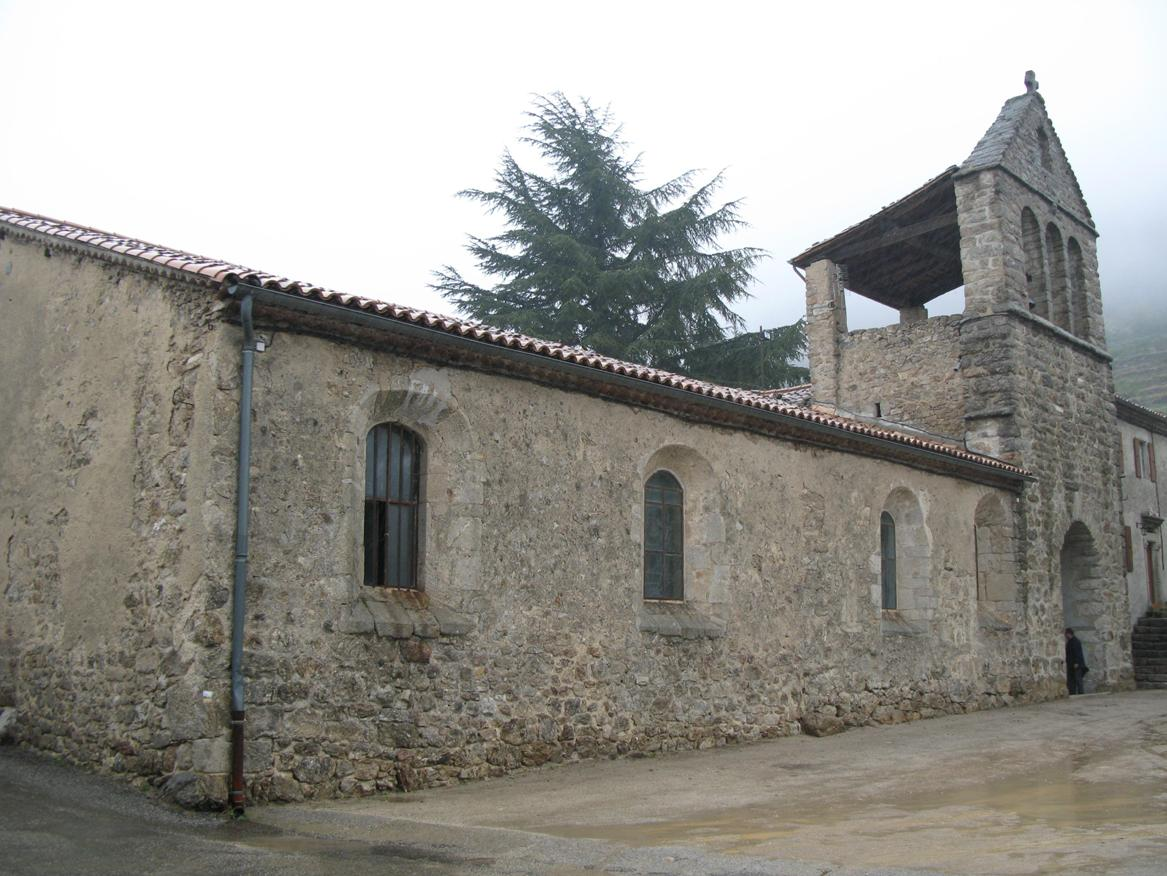
- The church in Laboule
- Location of Laboule
- Location within France Location within Auvergne-Rhône-Alpes
- Coordinates: 44°35′19″N 4°10′00″E
- Country: France
- Region: Auvergne-Rhône-Alpes
- Department: Ardèche
- Arrondissement: Largentière
- Canton: Les Cévennes ardéchoises
- Intercommunality: Pays Beaume Drobie

Government
  - Mayor (2020–2026): Françoise Gallet
- Area^{1}: 17.45 km^{2} (6.74 sq mi)
- Elevation: 550 m (1,800 ft)
- Highest elevation: 1,410 m (4,630 ft)
- Lowest elevation: 393 m (1,289 ft)
- Population (2023): 146
  - Density: 8.37/km^{2} (21.7/sq mi)
- Time zone: UTC+01:00 (CET)
  - Summer (DST): UTC+02:00 (CEST)
- INSEE/Postal code: 07118 /07110
- ^{1} French Land Register data, which excludes lakes, ponds, glaciers > 1 km^{2} (0.386 sq mi or 247 acres) and river estuaries.

Laboule (French pronunciation: [labul]; Occitan: La Bola) is a commune in the Ardèche department in southern France.

== Population ==
Historical population

Year	Pop.	±% p.a.
1793	720	—
1800	693	−0.54%
1806	781	+2.01%
1821	825	+0.37%
1831	947	+1.39%
1836	969	+0.46%
1841	975	+0.12%
1846	989	+0.29%
1851	1,000	+0.22%
1856	930	−1.44%
1861	925	−0.11%
1866	956	+0.66%
1872	960	+0.07%
1876	889	−1.90%
1881	836	−1.22%
1886	808	−0.68%
1891	781	−0.68%
1896	752	−0.75%
1901	772	+0.53%

Year	Pop.	±% p.a.
1906	769	−0.08%
1911	706	−1.69%
1921	617	−1.34%
1926	500	−4.12%
1931	402	−4.27%
1936	403	+0.05%
1946	323	−2.19%
1954	229	−4.21%
1962	145	−5.55%
1968	127	−2.18%
1975	92	−4.50%
1982	111	+2.72%
1990	108	−0.34%
1999	112	+0.40%
2007	139	+2.74%
2012	149	+1.40%
2017	137	−1.67%
2023	146	+1.07%

Source: EHESS and INSEE (1968-2023)

== See also ==
- Communes of the Ardèche department
