= Dompnac =

- Commune
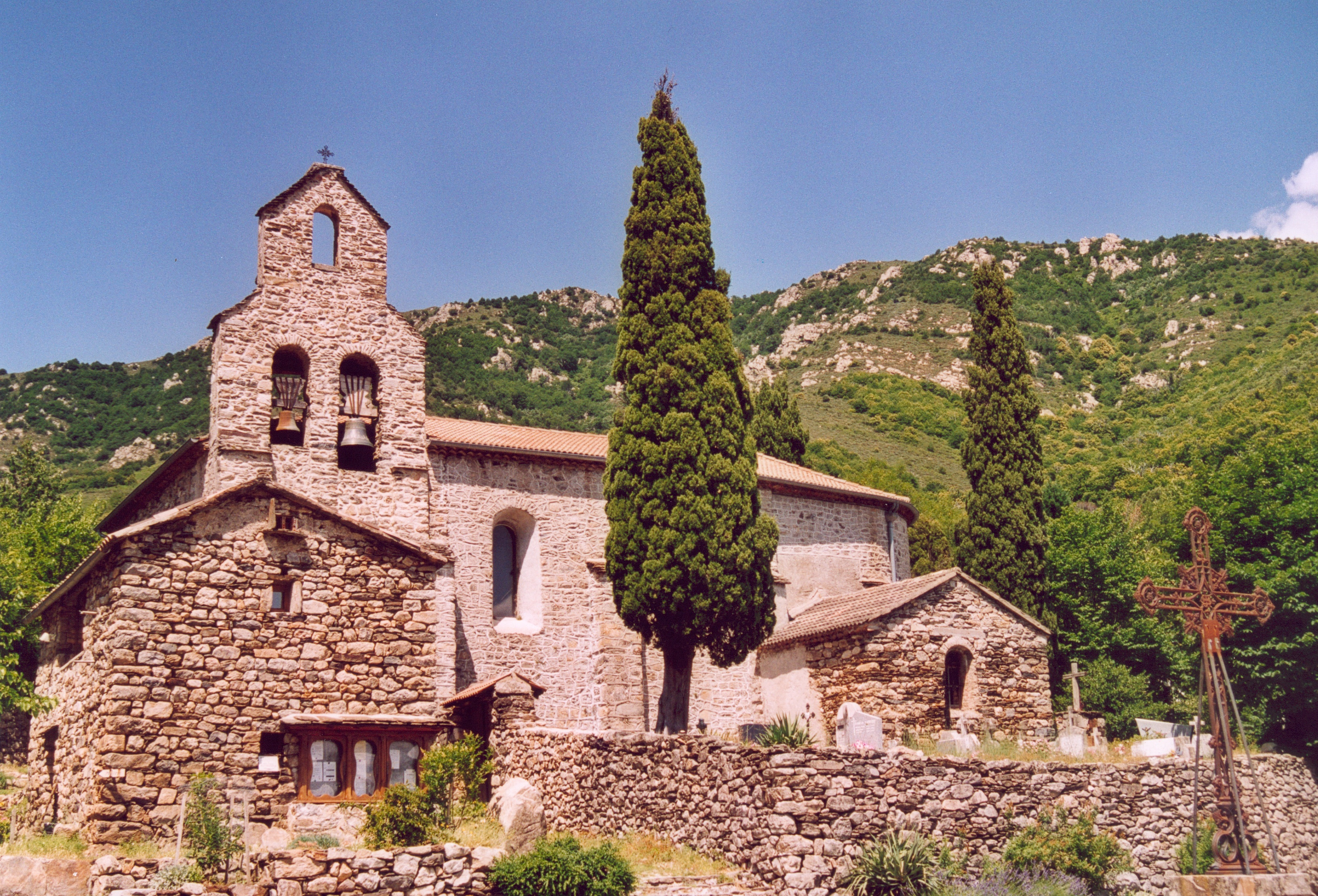
- The church in Dompnac
- Location of Dompnac
- Location within France Location within Auvergne-Rhône-Alpes
- Coordinates: 44°33′55″N 4°06′18″E
- Country: France
- Region: Auvergne-Rhône-Alpes
- Department: Ardèche
- Arrondissement: Largentière
- Canton: Les Cévennes ardéchoises
- Intercommunality: Pays Beaume Drobie

Government
  - Mayor (2020–2026): Carole Lastella
- Area^{1}: 16.12 km^{2} (6.22 sq mi)
- Elevation: 510 m (1,670 ft)
- Highest elevation: 1,249 m (4,098 ft)
- Lowest elevation: 355 m (1,165 ft)
- Population (2023): 78
  - Density: 4.8/km^{2} (13/sq mi)
- Time zone: UTC+01:00 (CET)
  - Summer (DST): UTC+02:00 (CEST)
- INSEE/Postal code: 07081 /07260
- ^{1} French Land Register data, which excludes lakes, ponds, glaciers > 1 km^{2} (0.386 sq mi or 247 acres) and river estuaries.

Dompnac is a commune in the Ardèche department in southern France.

== Population ==
Historical population
| Year | Pop. | ±% p.a. |
|---|---|---|
| 1968 | 62 | — |
| 1975 | 65 | +0.68% |
| 1982 | 71 | +1.27% |
| 1990 | 62 | −1.68% |
| 1999 | 82 | +3.16% |
| 2007 | 94 | +1.72% |
| 2012 | 73 | −4.93% |
| 2017 | 62 | −3.21% |
| 2023 | 78 | +3.90% |
Source: INSEE

== See also ==
- Communes of the Ardèche department
