= Chandolas =

- Commune
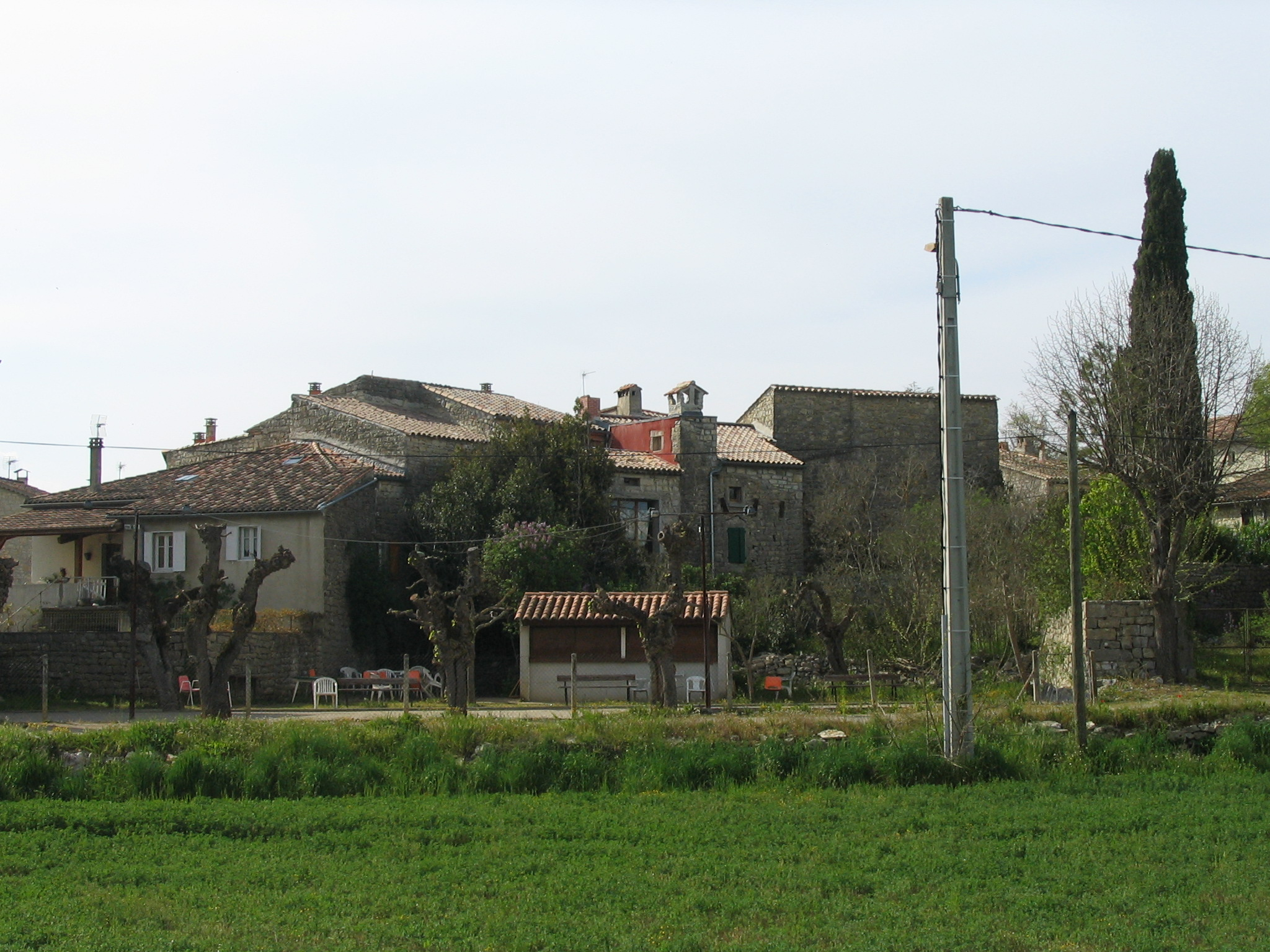
- A general view of Chandolas
- Location of Chandolas
- Location within France Location within Auvergne-Rhône-Alpes
- Coordinates: 44°24′16″N 4°15′12″E
- Country: France
- Region: Auvergne-Rhône-Alpes
- Department: Ardèche
- Arrondissement: Largentière
- Canton: Les Cévennes ardéchoises
- Intercommunality: Pays Beaume Drobie

Government
  - Mayor (2020–2026): Jean-François Thibon
- Area^{1}: 11.63 km^{2} (4.49 sq mi)
- Elevation: 130 m (430 ft)
- Highest elevation: 242 m (794 ft)
- Lowest elevation: 105 m (344 ft)
- Population (2023): 547
  - Density: 47.0/km^{2} (122/sq mi)
- Time zone: UTC+01:00 (CET)
  - Summer (DST): UTC+02:00 (CEST)
- INSEE/Postal code: 07053 /07230
- ^{1} French Land Register data, which excludes lakes, ponds, glaciers > 1 km^{2} (0.386 sq mi or 247 acres) and river estuaries.

Chandolas (French pronunciation: [ʃɑ̃dɔlas]) is a commune in the Ardèche department in southern France.

== Population ==
Historical population
Year	Pop.	±% p.a.
1968	411	—
1975	394	−0.60%
1982	383	−0.40%
1990	366	−0.57%
1999	342	−0.75%
2007	438	+3.14%
2012	482	+1.93%
2017	506	+0.98%
2023	547	+1.31%
Source: INSEE

== See also ==
- Communes of the Ardèche department
