= Canton of Les Cévennes ardéchoises =

Coordinates: 44.41°N 4.13°E

- Canton
- Situation of the canton of Les Cévennes ardéchoises in the department of Ardèche
- Country: France
- Region: Auvergne-Rhône-Alpes
- Department: Ardèche
- No. of communes: {{{nbcomm}}}
- Population (2023): 19,388
- INSEE code: 0716

The canton of Les Cévennes ardéchoises (French: canton des Cévennes ardéchoises; before 2016: canton of Les Vans, canton des Vans) is an administrative division of the Ardèche department, southern France. It elects two members of the Departmental Council of Ardèche, known as departmental councillors (conseillers départementaux). Its borders were modified at the French canton reorganisation that came into effect in March 2015. Its seat is Les Vans.

== Communes ==
It consists of the following communes, all within the arrondissement of Largentière:

1. Les Assions
2. Banne
3. Beaulieu
4. Beaumont
5. Berrias-et-Casteljau
6. Chambonas
7. Chandolas
8. Dompnac
9. Faugères
10. Gravières
11. Joyeuse
12. Lablachère
13. Laboule
14. Loubaresse
15. Malarce-sur-la-Thines
16. Malbosc
17. Montselgues
18. Payzac
19. Planzolles
20. Ribes
21. Rocles
22. Rosières
23. Sablières
24. Saint-André-de-Cruzières
25. Saint-André-Lachamp
26. Sainte-Marguerite-Lafigère
27. Saint-Genest-de-Beauzon
28. Saint-Mélany
29. Saint-Paul-le-Jeune
30. Saint-Pierre-Saint-Jean
31. Saint-Sauveur-de-Cruzières
32. Les Salelles
33. Valgorge
34. Les Vans
35. Vernon
