= Beaumont, Ardèche =

Beaumont
- Commune
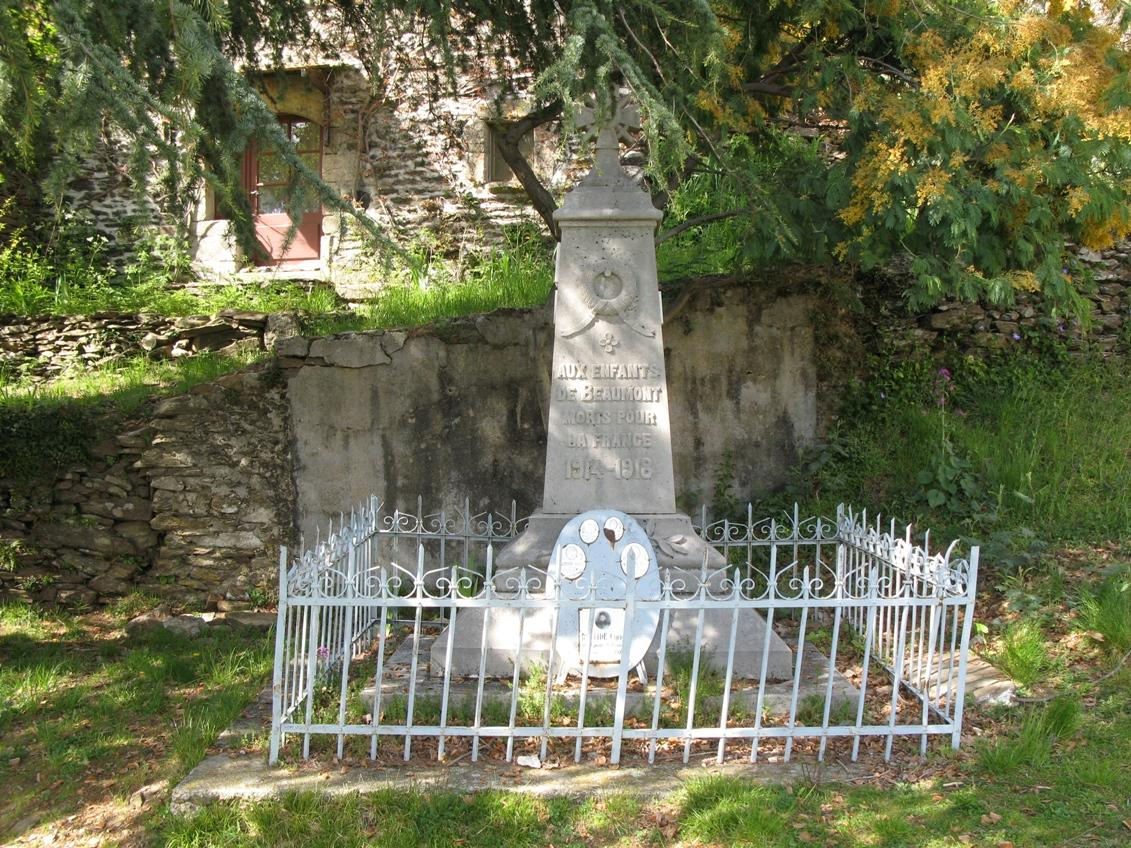
- The war memorial in Beaumont
- Location of Beaumont
- Location within France Location within Auvergne-Rhône-Alpes
- Coordinates: 44°32′20″N 4°10′03″E
- Country: France
- Region: Auvergne-Rhône-Alpes
- Department: Ardèche
- Arrondissement: Largentière
- Canton: Les Cévennes ardéchoises
- Intercommunality: Pays Beaume Drobie

Government
  - Mayor (2020–2026): Agnès Audibert
- Area^{1}: 19.16 km^{2} (7.40 sq mi)
- Elevation: 620 m (2,030 ft)
- Highest elevation: 1,000 m (3,300 ft)
- Lowest elevation: 207 m (679 ft)
- Population (2023): 262
  - Density: 13.7/km^{2} (35.4/sq mi)
- Time zone: UTC+01:00 (CET)
  - Summer (DST): UTC+02:00 (CEST)
- INSEE/Postal code: 07029 /07110
- ^{1} French Land Register data, which excludes lakes, ponds, glaciers > 1 km^{2} (0.386 sq mi or 247 acres) and river estuaries.

Beaumont (French pronunciation: [bomɔ̃]; Occitan: Bèlmont) is a commune in the Ardèche department in southern France.

== Population ==
Historical population
Year	Pop.	±% p.a.
1968	193	—
1975	162	−2.47%
1982	173	+0.94%
1990	161	−0.89%
1999	173	+0.80%
2007	204	+2.08%
2012	223	+1.80%
2017	244	+1.82%
2023	262	+1.19%
Source: INSEE

== See also ==
- Communes of the Ardèche department
