= Vernon, Ardèche =

Vernon
- Commune
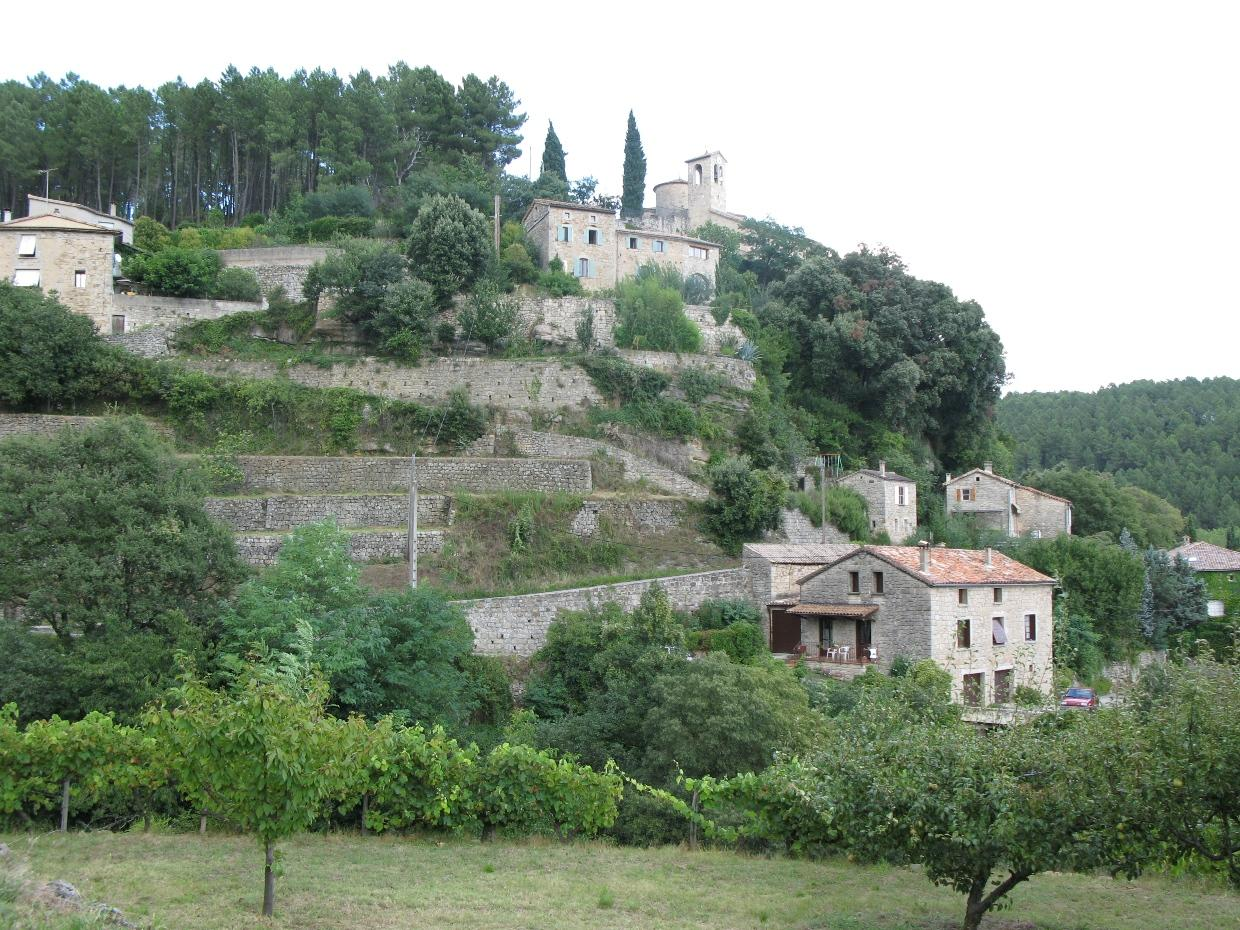
- A general view of Vernon
- Location of Vernon
- Location within France Location within Auvergne-Rhône-Alpes
- Coordinates: 44°30′30″N 4°13′34″E
- Country: France
- Region: Auvergne-Rhône-Alpes
- Department: Ardèche
- Arrondissement: Largentière
- Canton: Les Cévennes ardéchoises
- Intercommunality: Pays Beaume Drobie

Government
  - Mayor (2020–2026): Alexandre Faure
- Area^{1}: 3.71 km^{2} (1.43 sq mi)
- Elevation: 250 m (820 ft)
- Highest elevation: 471 m (1,545 ft)
- Lowest elevation: 160 m (520 ft)
- Population (2023): 235
  - Density: 63.3/km^{2} (164/sq mi)
- Time zone: UTC+01:00 (CET)
  - Summer (DST): UTC+02:00 (CEST)
- INSEE/Postal code: 07336 /07260
- ^{1} French Land Register data, which excludes lakes, ponds, glaciers > 1 km^{2} (0.386 sq mi or 247 acres) and river estuaries.

Vernon (French pronunciation: [vɛʁnɔ̃]) is a commune in the Ardèche department in southern France.

== Population ==
Historical population
| Year | Pop. | ±% p.a. |
|---|---|---|
| 1968 | 192 | — |
| 1975 | 166 | −2.06% |
| 1982 | 170 | +0.34% |
| 1990 | 185 | +1.06% |
| 1999 | 203 | +1.04% |
| 2007 | 215 | +0.72% |
| 2012 | 224 | +0.82% |
| 2017 | 232 | +0.70% |
| 2023 | 235 | +0.21% |
Source: INSEE

== See also ==
- Communes of the Ardèche department
