= Planzolles =

- Commune
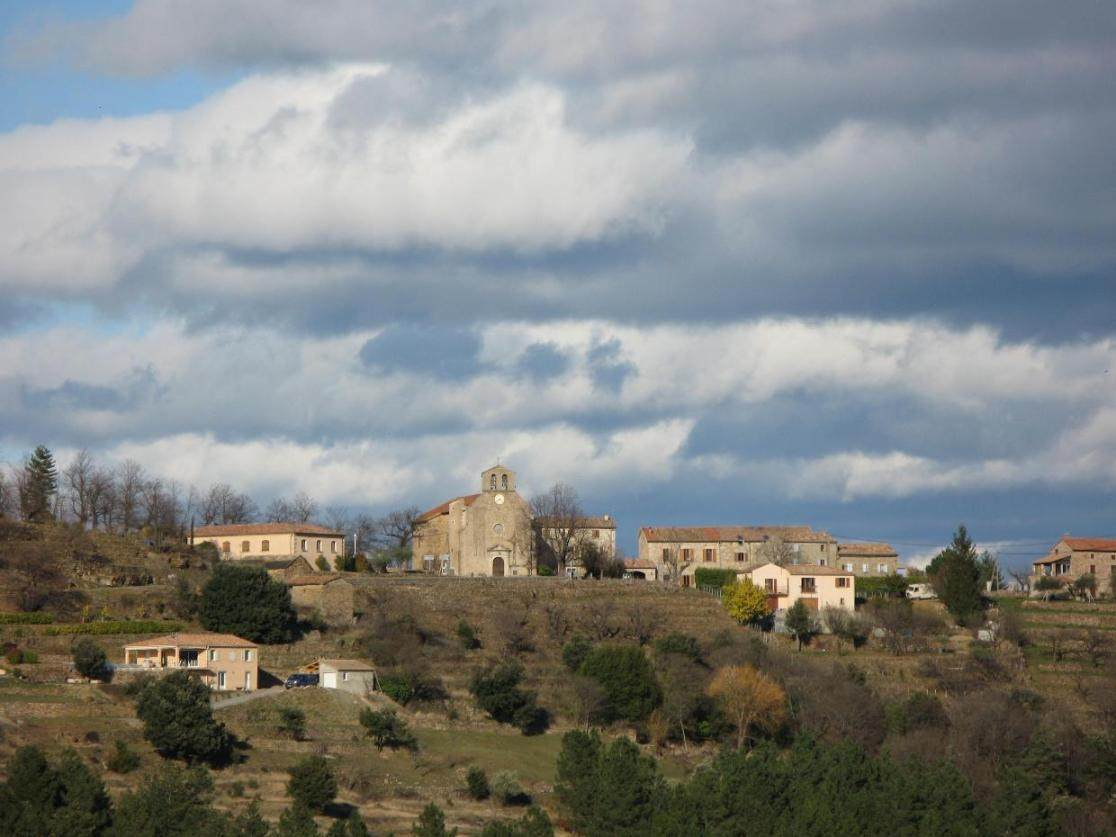
- The church and surrounding buildings in Planzolles
- Location of Planzolles
- Location within France Location within Auvergne-Rhône-Alpes
- Coordinates: 44°29′11″N 4°09′18″E
- Country: France
- Region: Auvergne-Rhône-Alpes
- Department: Ardèche
- Arrondissement: Largentière
- Canton: Les Cévennes ardéchoises
- Intercommunality: Pays Beaume-Drobie

Government
  - Mayor (2020–2026): Christophe Deffreix
- Area^{1}: 5.41 km^{2} (2.09 sq mi)
- Elevation: 507 m (1,663 ft)
- Highest elevation: 727 m (2,385 ft)
- Lowest elevation: 260 m (850 ft)
- Population (2023): 164
  - Density: 30.3/km^{2} (78.5/sq mi)
- Time zone: UTC+01:00 (CET)
  - Summer (DST): UTC+02:00 (CEST)
- INSEE/Postal code: 07176 /07230
- ^{1} French Land Register data, which excludes lakes, ponds, glaciers > 1 km^{2} (0.386 sq mi or 247 acres) and river estuaries.

Planzolles (French pronunciation: [plɑ̃zɔl]; Occitan: Plansòlas) is a commune in the Ardèche department in southern France.

== Population ==
Historical population
Year	Pop.	±% p.a.
1968	85	—
1975	83	−0.34%
1982	74	−1.63%
1990	96	+3.31%
1999	121	+2.60%
2007	134	+1.28%
2012	135	+0.15%
2017	135	+0.00%
2023	164	+3.30%
Source: INSEE

== See also ==
- Communes of the Ardèche department
