= Loubaresse, Ardèche =

Loubaresse
- Commune
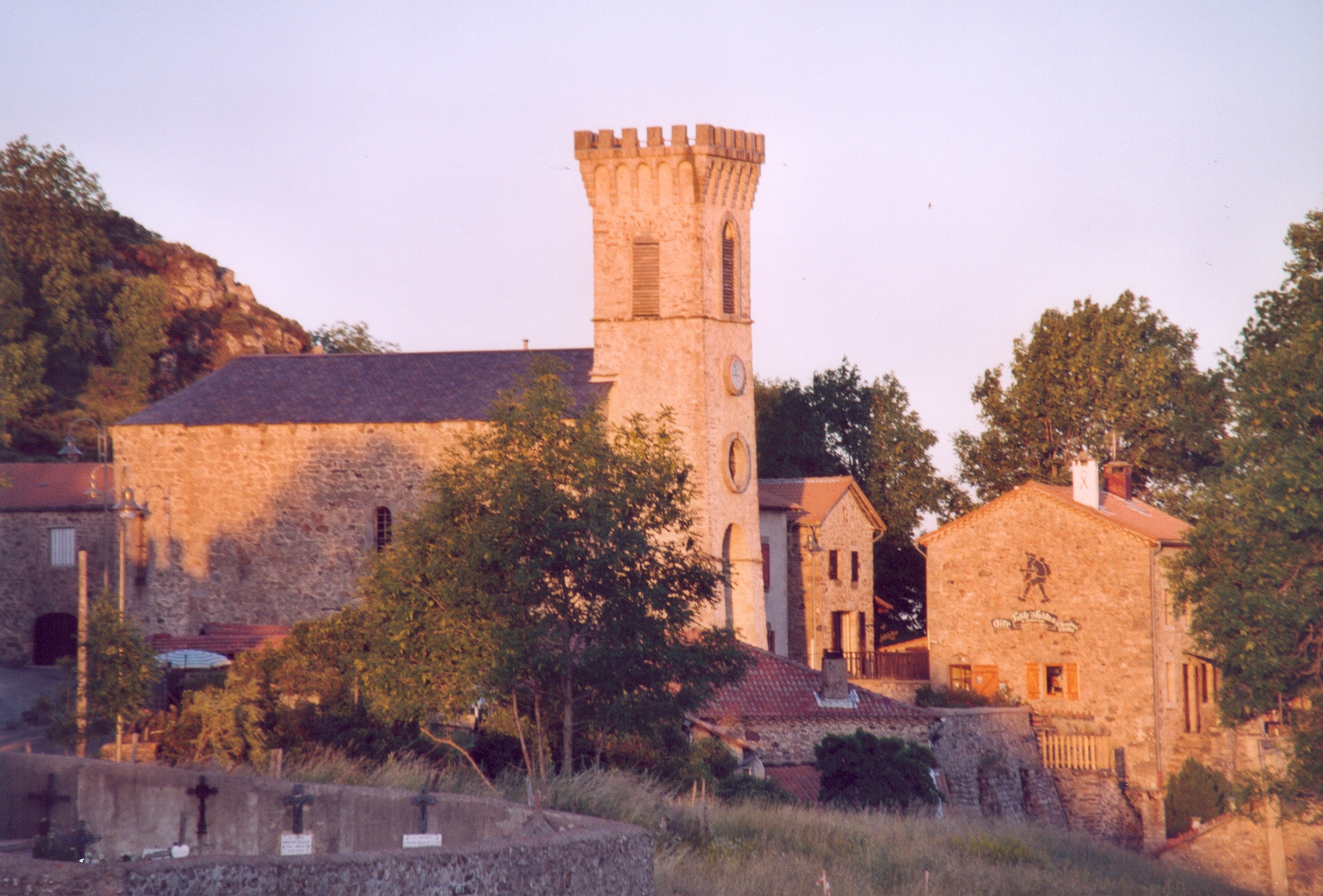
- The church in Loubaresse
- Location of Loubaresse
- Location within France Location within Auvergne-Rhône-Alpes
- Coordinates: 44°36′02″N 4°03′03″E
- Country: France
- Region: Auvergne-Rhône-Alpes
- Department: Ardèche
- Arrondissement: Largentière
- Canton: Les Cévennes ardéchoises

Government
  - Mayor (2020–2026): Julien Goube
- Area^{1}: 8.99 km^{2} (3.47 sq mi)
- Elevation: 1,200 m (3,900 ft)
- Highest elevation: 1,433 m (4,701 ft)
- Lowest elevation: 871 m (2,858 ft)
- Population (2023): 43
  - Density: 4.8/km^{2} (12/sq mi)
- Time zone: UTC+01:00 (CET)
  - Summer (DST): UTC+02:00 (CEST)
- INSEE/Postal code: 07144 /07110
- ^{1} French Land Register data, which excludes lakes, ponds, glaciers > 1 km^{2} (0.386 sq mi or 247 acres) and river estuaries.

Loubaresse (French pronunciation: [lubaʁɛs]; Occitan: Lobaressa) is a commune in the Ardèche department in southern France.

== Population ==
Historical population
Year	Pop.	±% p.a.
1968	43	—
1975	29	−5.47%
1982	30	+0.49%
1990	26	−1.77%
1999	32	+2.33%
2007	32	+0.00%
2012	31	−0.63%
2017	41	+5.75%
2023	43	+0.80%
Source: INSEE

== See also ==
- Communes of the Ardèche department
