= Valgorge =

- Commune
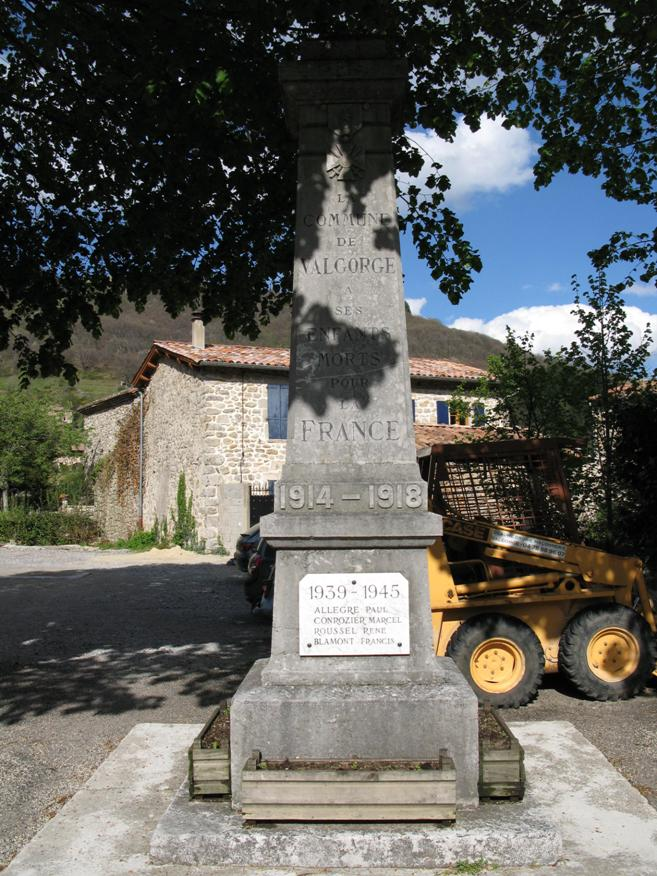
- The war memorial in Valgorge

- Coat of arms
- Location of Valgorge
- Location within France Location within Auvergne-Rhône-Alpes
- Coordinates: 44°35′17″N 4°07′47″E
- Country: France
- Region: Auvergne-Rhône-Alpes
- Department: Ardèche
- Arrondissement: Largentière
- Canton: Les Cévennes ardéchoises
- Intercommunality: Pays Beaume Drobie

Government
  - Mayor (2020–2026): Guillaume Bonin
- Area^{1}: 26.36 km^{2} (10.18 sq mi)
- Elevation: 561 m (1,841 ft)
- Highest elevation: 1,482 m (4,862 ft)
- Lowest elevation: 419 m (1,375 ft)
- Population (2023): 412
  - Density: 15.6/km^{2} (40.5/sq mi)
- Time zone: UTC+01:00 (CET)
  - Summer (DST): UTC+02:00 (CEST)
- INSEE/Postal code: 07329 /07110
- ^{1} French Land Register data, which excludes lakes, ponds, glaciers > 1 km^{2} (0.386 sq mi or 247 acres) and river estuaries.

Valgorge (French pronunciation: [valɡɔʁʒ]; Occitan: Vaugòrja) is a commune in the Ardèche department in southern France.

== Population ==
Historical population
Year	Pop.	±% p.a.
1968	338	—
1975	353	+0.62%
1982	330	−0.96%
1990	430	+3.36%
1999	450	+0.51%
2007	439	−0.31%
2012	470	+1.37%
2017	436	−1.49%
2023	412	−0.94%
Source: INSEE

== See also ==
- Communes of the Ardèche department
