= Lablachère =

- Commune
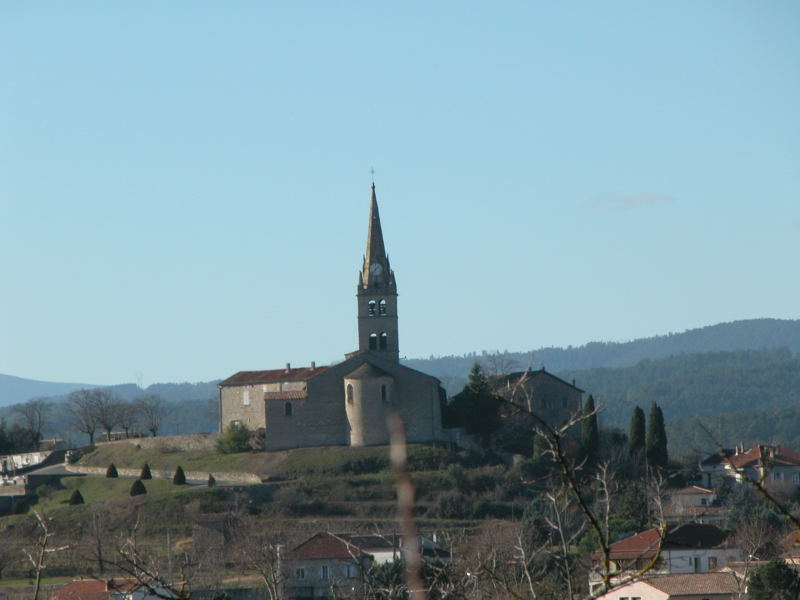
- The church in Lablachère
- Location of Lablachère
- Location within France Location within Auvergne-Rhône-Alpes
- Coordinates: 44°27′52″N 4°12′54″E
- Country: France
- Region: Auvergne-Rhône-Alpes
- Department: Ardèche
- Arrondissement: Largentière
- Canton: Les Cévennes ardéchoises

Government
  - Mayor (2020–2026): Jean-Pierre Laporte
- Area^{1}: 26.38 km^{2} (10.19 sq mi)
- Elevation: 289 m (948 ft)
- Highest elevation: 451 m (1,480 ft)
- Lowest elevation: 160 m (520 ft)
- Population (2023): 2,193
  - Density: 83.13/km^{2} (215.3/sq mi)
- Time zone: UTC+01:00 (CET)
  - Summer (DST): UTC+02:00 (CEST)
- INSEE/Postal code: 07117 /07230
- ^{1} French Land Register data, which excludes lakes, ponds, glaciers > 1 km^{2} (0.386 sq mi or 247 acres) and river estuaries.

Lablachère (French pronunciation: [lablaʃɛʁ]; Occitan: La Blachèira) is a commune in the Ardèche department in southern France.

== Population ==
Historical population

Year	Pop.	±% p.a.
1793	1,827	—
1800	1,752	−0.60%
1806	1,807	+0.52%
1821	2,312	+1.66%
1831	2,865	+2.17%
1836	2,780	−0.60%
1841	2,981	+1.41%
1846	2,836	−0.99%
1851	2,944	+0.75%
1856	2,861	−0.57%
1861	2,675	−1.34%
1866	2,528	−1.12%
1872	2,519	−0.06%
1876	2,276	−2.50%
1881	1,996	−2.59%
1886	2,029	+0.33%
1891	1,928	−1.02%
1896	1,891	−0.39%
1901	1,869	−0.23%

Year	Pop.	±% p.a.
1906	1,872	+0.03%
1911	1,690	−2.02%
1921	1,558	−0.81%
1926	1,457	−1.33%
1931	1,530	+0.98%
1936	1,554	+0.31%
1946	1,400	−1.04%
1954	1,338	−0.56%
1962	1,250	−0.85%
1968	1,270	+0.26%
1975	1,277	+0.08%
1982	1,392	+1.24%
1990	1,562	+1.45%
1999	1,520	−0.30%
2007	1,783	+2.01%
2012	1,978	+2.10%
2017	2,143	+1.62%
2023	2,193	+0.39%

Source: EHESS and INSEE (1968-2023)

== See also ==
- Communes of the Ardèche department
