= Faugères, Ardèche =

Faugères
- Commune
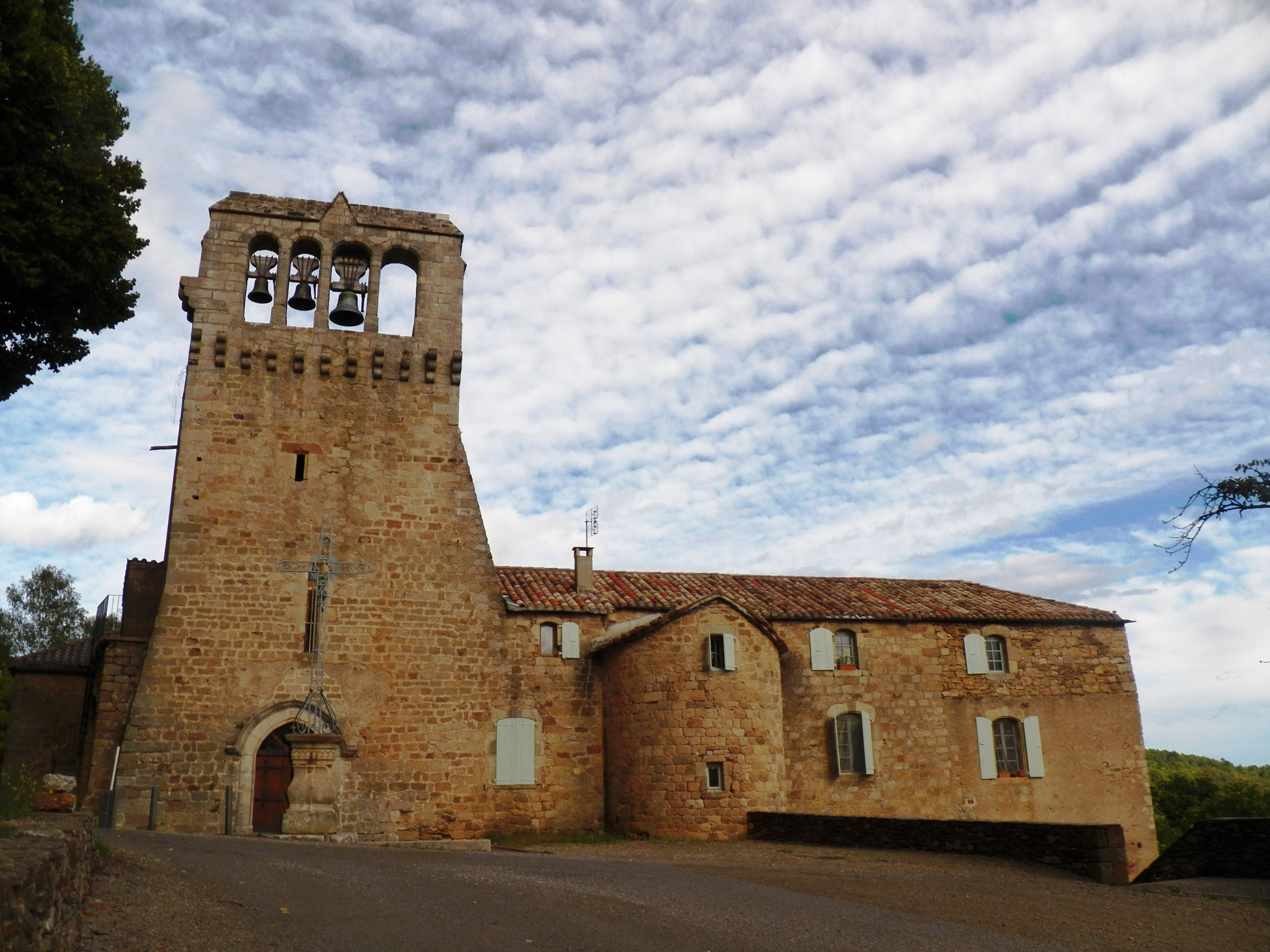
- The church in Faugères

- Coat of arms
- Location of Faugères
- Location within France Location within Auvergne-Rhône-Alpes
- Coordinates: 44°28′32″N 4°08′11″E
- Country: France
- Region: Auvergne-Rhône-Alpes
- Department: Ardèche
- Arrondissement: Largentière
- Canton: Les Cévennes ardéchoises
- Intercommunality: Pays Beaume Drobie

Government
  - Mayor (2023–2026): Philippe Gontier
- Area^{1}: 5.99 km^{2} (2.31 sq mi)
- Elevation: 400 m (1,300 ft)
- Highest elevation: 811 m (2,661 ft)
- Lowest elevation: 299 m (981 ft)
- Population (2023): 123
  - Density: 20.5/km^{2} (53.2/sq mi)
- Time zone: UTC+01:00 (CET)
  - Summer (DST): UTC+02:00 (CEST)
- INSEE/Postal code: 07088 /07230
- ^{1} French Land Register data, which excludes lakes, ponds, glaciers > 1 km^{2} (0.386 sq mi or 247 acres) and river estuaries.

Faugères (French pronunciation: [foʒɛʁ]; Occitan: Faugièiras) is a commune in the Ardèche department in southern France.

== Population ==
Historical population
Year	Pop.	±% p.a.
1968	122	—
1975	122	+0.00%
1982	120	−0.24%
1990	106	−1.54%
1999	101	−0.54%
2007	90	−1.43%
2012	108	+3.71%
2017	100	−1.53%
2023	123	+3.51%
Source: INSEE

== See also ==
- Communes of the Ardèche department
