= Payzac, Ardèche =

Payzac
- Commune
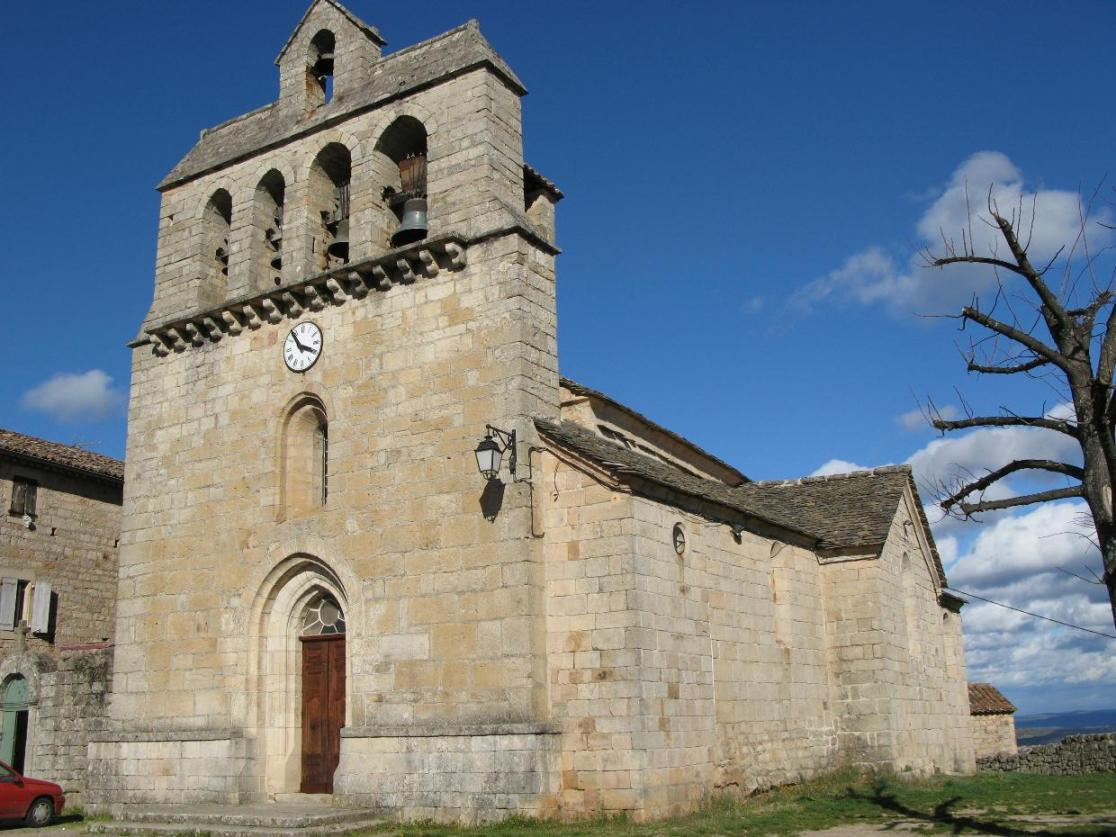
- The church in Payzac
- Location of Payzac
- Location within France Location within Auvergne-Rhône-Alpes
- Coordinates: 44°27′16″N 4°09′14″E
- Country: France
- Region: Auvergne-Rhône-Alpes
- Department: Ardèche
- Arrondissement: Largentière
- Canton: Les Cévennes ardéchoises
- Intercommunality: Pays Beaume Drobie

Government
  - Mayor (2020–2026): François Coulange
- Area^{1}: 13.7 km^{2} (5.3 sq mi)
- Elevation: 400 m (1,300 ft)
- Highest elevation: 619 m (2,031 ft)
- Lowest elevation: 188 m (617 ft)
- Population (2023): 539
  - Density: 39.3/km^{2} (102/sq mi)
- Time zone: UTC+01:00 (CET)
  - Summer (DST): UTC+02:00 (CEST)
- INSEE/Postal code: 07171 /07230
- ^{1} French Land Register data, which excludes lakes, ponds, glaciers > 1 km^{2} (0.386 sq mi or 247 acres) and river estuaries.

Payzac (French pronunciation: [pɛzak]; Occitan: Paisac) is a commune in the Ardèche department in southern France.

== Population ==
Historical population

Year	Pop.	±% p.a.
1793	1,000	—
1800	1,052	+0.73%
1806	1,166	+1.73%
1821	1,156	−0.06%
1831	1,396	+1.90%
1836	1,301	−1.40%
1841	1,286	−0.23%
1846	1,294	+0.12%
1851	1,267	−0.42%
1856	1,163	−1.70%
1861	1,132	−0.54%
1866	1,126	−0.11%
1872	1,028	−1.51%
1876	1,046	+0.43%
1881	944	−2.03%
1886	866	−1.71%
1891	886	+0.46%
1896	820	−1.54%
1901	755	−1.64%

Year	Pop.	±% p.a.
1906	773	+0.47%
1911	712	−1.63%
1921	667	−0.65%
1926	640	−0.82%
1931	626	−0.44%
1936	620	−0.19%
1946	572	−0.80%
1954	515	−1.30%
1962	471	−1.11%
1968	413	−2.17%
1975	363	−1.83%
1982	424	+2.24%
1990	436	+0.35%
1999	389	−1.26%
2007	466	+2.28%
2012	552	+3.45%
2017	536	−0.59%
2023	539	+0.09%

Source: EHESS and INSEE (1968-2023)

== See also ==
- Communes of the Ardèche department
