= Saint-Paul-le-Jeune =

- Commune
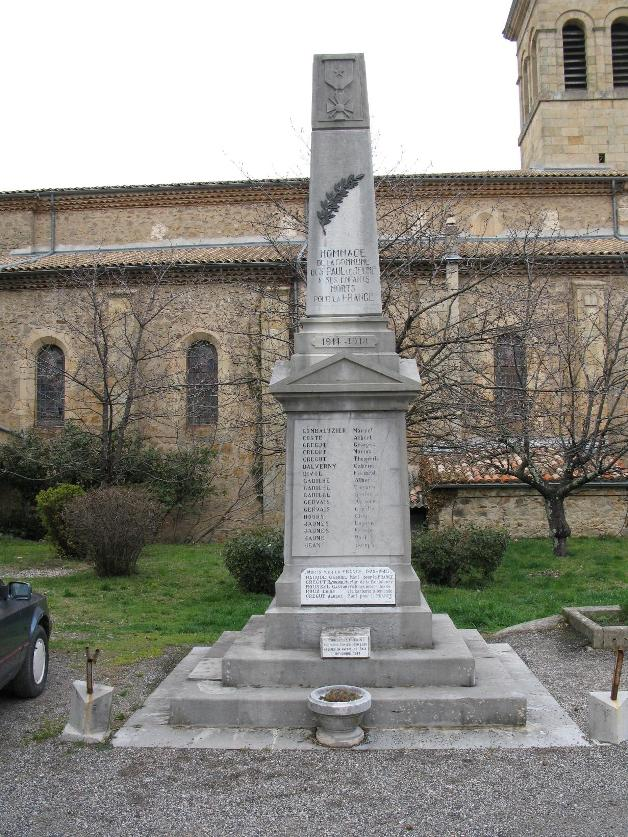
- War memorial
- Location of Saint-Paul-le-Jeune
- Location within France Location within Auvergne-Rhône-Alpes
- Coordinates: 44°20′28″N 4°09′15″E
- Country: France
- Region: Auvergne-Rhône-Alpes
- Department: Ardèche
- Arrondissement: Largentière
- Canton: Les Cévennes ardéchoises

Government
  - Mayor (2020–2026): Thierry Bruyère-Isnard
- Area^{1}: 14.38 km^{2} (5.55 sq mi)
- Elevation: 255 m (837 ft)
- Highest elevation: 451 m (1,480 ft)
- Lowest elevation: 196 m (643 ft)
- Population (2023): 968
  - Density: 67.3/km^{2} (174/sq mi)
- Time zone: UTC+01:00 (CET)
  - Summer (DST): UTC+02:00 (CEST)
- INSEE/Postal code: 07280 /07460
- ^{1} French Land Register data, which excludes lakes, ponds, glaciers > 1 km^{2} (0.386 sq mi or 247 acres) and river estuaries.

Saint-Paul-le-Jeune (Occitan: Sant Pau lo Jove) is a commune in the Ardèche department in the Auvergne-Rhône-Alpes région in southern France.

== Population ==
Historical population
Year	Pop.	±% p.a.
1968	847	—
1975	854	+0.12%
1982	819	−0.60%
1990	862	+0.64%
1999	762	−1.36%
2007	842	+1.26%
2012	940	+2.23%
2017	970	+0.63%
2023	968	−0.03%
Source: INSEE

== See also ==
- Communes of the Ardèche department
