= Volane =

River in southern France

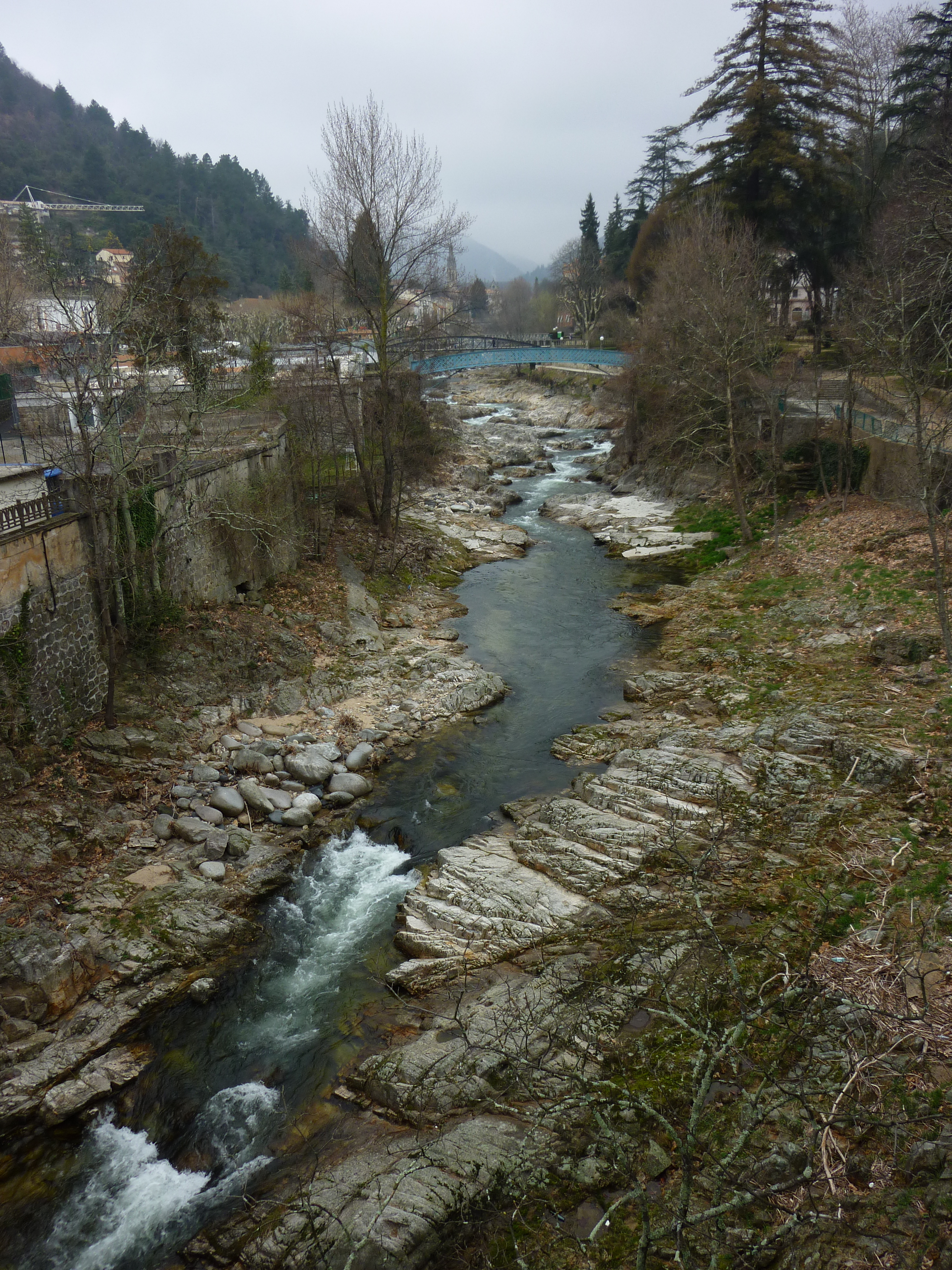
- The Volane at Vals-les-Bains

- Location within France Location within Auvergne-Rhône-Alpes

Location
- Country: France
- Cities: Antraigues-sur-Volane and Vals-les-Bains

Physical characteristics
- Source
  - location: at Suc de l'Areilladou, Mézilhac
  - coordinates: 44°37′36″N 4°18′34″E
  - elevation: 1,448 m (4,751 ft)
- Mouth
  - location: Ardèche, Labégude
  - coordinates: 44°39′7″N 4°21′39″E
  - elevation: 234 m (768 ft)
- Length: 22.5 km (14.0 mi)

Basin features
- Progression: Ardèche→ Rhône→ Mediterranean Sea
- River system: Rhône
- Tributaries
  - left: Bise
  - right: Bézorgues, Voltour
- Source: SANDRE et Géoportail

The Volane (French pronunciation: [vɔlan]) is a 22.5-kilometre-long (14.0 mi) French river, a tributary of the Ardèche and a sub-affluent of the Rhône.

== Geography ==
It crops at the foot of the suc de l'Areilladou at 1,448 metres (4,751 ft) in Mézilhac and at 1,400 metres (4,600 ft), nearly at the end of the téléski de l'Areilladou. It runs through (among others) the towns of Antraigues-sur-Volane and Vals-les-Bains. It joins the Ardèche north of Labégude, at 234 metres (768 ft) just outside Vals-les-Bains at le pont de Vals (locality) at less than 500 metres (1,600 ft) from the casino.

=== Communes ===
The river runs through eight communes:

- faring downstream : Mézilhac, Laviolle, Antraigues-sur-Volane, Genestelle, Asperjoc, Saint-Andéol-de-Vals, Vals-les-Bains, Labégude (confluence).

== Tributaries ==
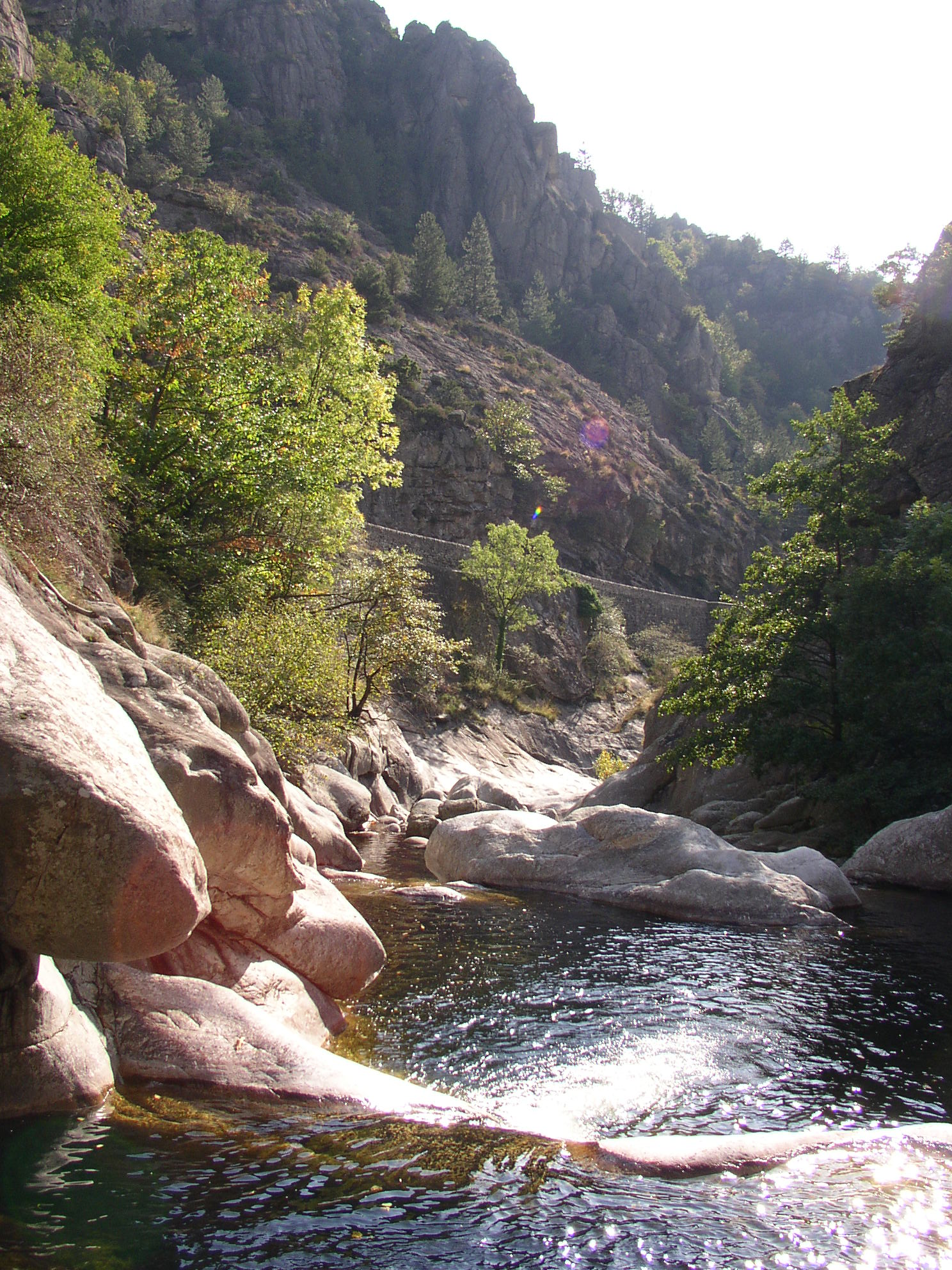
The Volane

The Volane has 21 official tributaries:

- ruisseau de Larbonnet (L) 2 km
- ruisseau des Hubertes (L) 1 km
- ruisseau du Crouzet (R) 3 km
- ruisseau de Pradas (L) 1 km
- ruisseau de Rocheplate (R) 1 km
- ruisseau de Fournier (L) 1 km
- ruisseau de Varneyre (R) 3 km
- ruisseau de la Sapède (R) 2 km
- ruisseau de Fontfreyde (R) 1 km
- ruisseau de Rouyon (R) 2 km
- ruisseau du Bouchet (R) 2 km
- ruisseau des Fuels (R) 2 km
- ruisseau de Bise (L) 9 km
- ruisseau de Coupe (R) 2 km
- ruisseau de Pra Michel (L) 1 km
- ruisseau de la Borie (L) 1 km
- ruisseau de la Combe (R) 1 km
- ruisseau de la Chadeyre (L) 1 km
- la Bézorgues (R) 19 km
- ruisseau de Rouchon (L) 1 km
- le Voltour (R) 7 km

== Topography ==
The river watershed spans eight communes including 7,241 inhabitants for an area of 123 km^{2} (47 sq mi) - with an average of 59 inhabitants/km^{2} and 563 metres (1,847 ft) in elevation.

== Ecology ==
La Volane is a piscicole stream of 1st category (lush in trout and other salmonids). .

== Culture ==
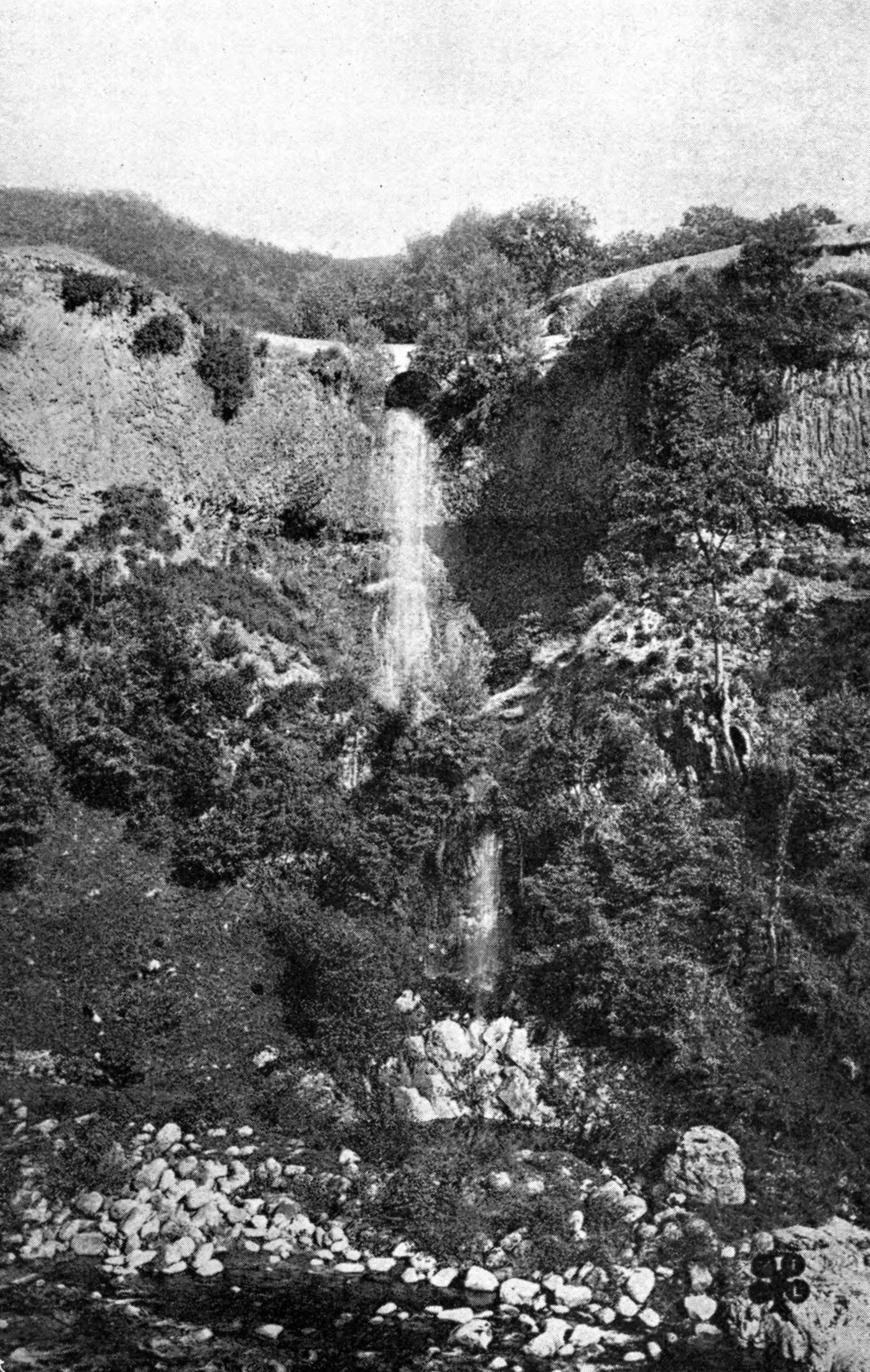
The Volane in "A book of the Cévennes" by Sabine Baring-Gould

The Volane is photographed in "A book of the Cévennes" by Sabine Baring-Gould.

== Toponym ==
The Volane gave its name to Antraigues-sur-Volane.
