= Antraigues-sur-Volane =

- Part of Vallées-d'Antraigues-Asperjoc
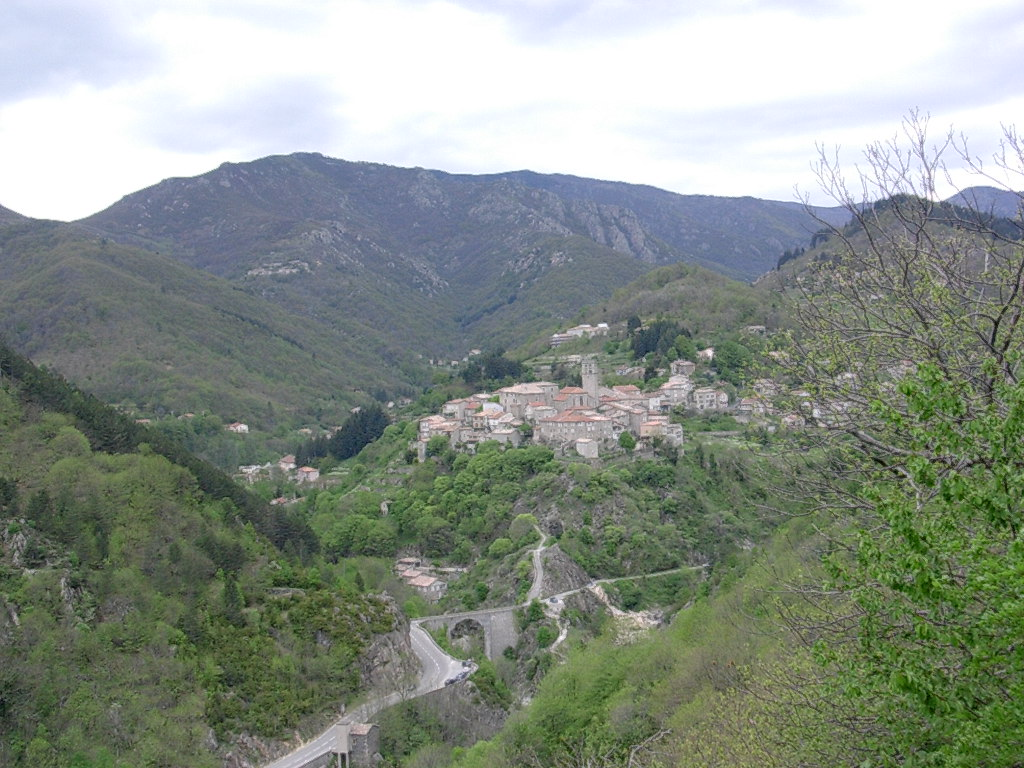
- Confluence of the Bise and the Volane
- Location of Antraigues-sur-Volane
- Location within France Location within Auvergne-Rhône-Alpes
- Coordinates: 44°43′09″N 4°21′30″E
- Country: France
- Region: Auvergne-Rhône-Alpes
- Department: Ardèche
- Arrondissement: Largentière
- Canton: Aubenas-1
- Commune: Vallées-d'Antraigues-Asperjoc
- Area^{1}: 13.46 km^{2} (5.20 sq mi)
- Elevation: 472 m (1,549 ft)
- Highest elevation: 1,344 m (4,409 ft)
- Lowest elevation: 372 m (1,220 ft)
- Population (2021): 498
  - Density: 37.0/km^{2} (95.8/sq mi)
- Time zone: UTC+01:00 (CET)
  - Summer (DST): UTC+02:00 (CEST)
- Postal code: 07530
- ^{1} French Land Register data, which excludes lakes, ponds, glaciers > 1 km^{2} (0.386 sq mi or 247 acres) and river estuaries.

Antraigues-sur-Volane (French pronunciation: [ɑ̃tʁɛɡ syʁ vɔlan], literally Antraigues on Volane; Occitan: Entraigas, before 1989: Antraigues) is a former commune in the Ardèche department in the Auvergne-Rhône-Alpes region of southern France. On 1 January 2019, it was merged into the new commune Vallées-d'Antraigues-Asperjoc.

== Geography ==
=== Location ===
Antraigues-sur-Volane is located 5 kilometres north of Vals-les-Bains and 14 km north of Aubenas. The village lies on the edge of the Ardèche Cévennes with the northern boundary ending at the Mézilhac Pass and the Vivarais Mountains.

Access to the commune is on the D578 road from Val-les-Bains in the south to the village then continuing north through the heart of the commune to Laviolle in the north. There is also the D254 going west from the D578 just outside the village via a mountainous route to Labastide-sur-Besorgues in the west. Similarly the D318 road goes east from the village by a mountainous route to Genestelle in the east. The commune is mountainous with some mountain roads accessing parts of the commune.

=== Hydrology ===
The Volane river flows from the north through the commune where it is joined by many tributaries including the Ruisseau de Rouyon, the Ruisseau du Bouchet, the Ruisseau des Fuels, the Rivière de Bise, the Ruisseau de Coupe (which forms the southern border of the commune), and many other unnamed streams.

== History ==
In 1841 the commune of Laviolle was created from a part of Antraigues. Antraigues took its current name on 20 August 1989.

In the 1960s Mayor Jean Saussac brought in many artists such as Jacques Brel, Lino Ventura, Pierre Brasseur, Claude Nougaro, Alexander Calder, Allain Leprest Francesca Solleville, Aubret Isabelle and Jean Ferrat, who settled permanently in the village and became deputy mayors in charge of culture. As a result, the nickname "Little Saint Tropez of the Ardèche" was attributed to the commune.

== Administration ==
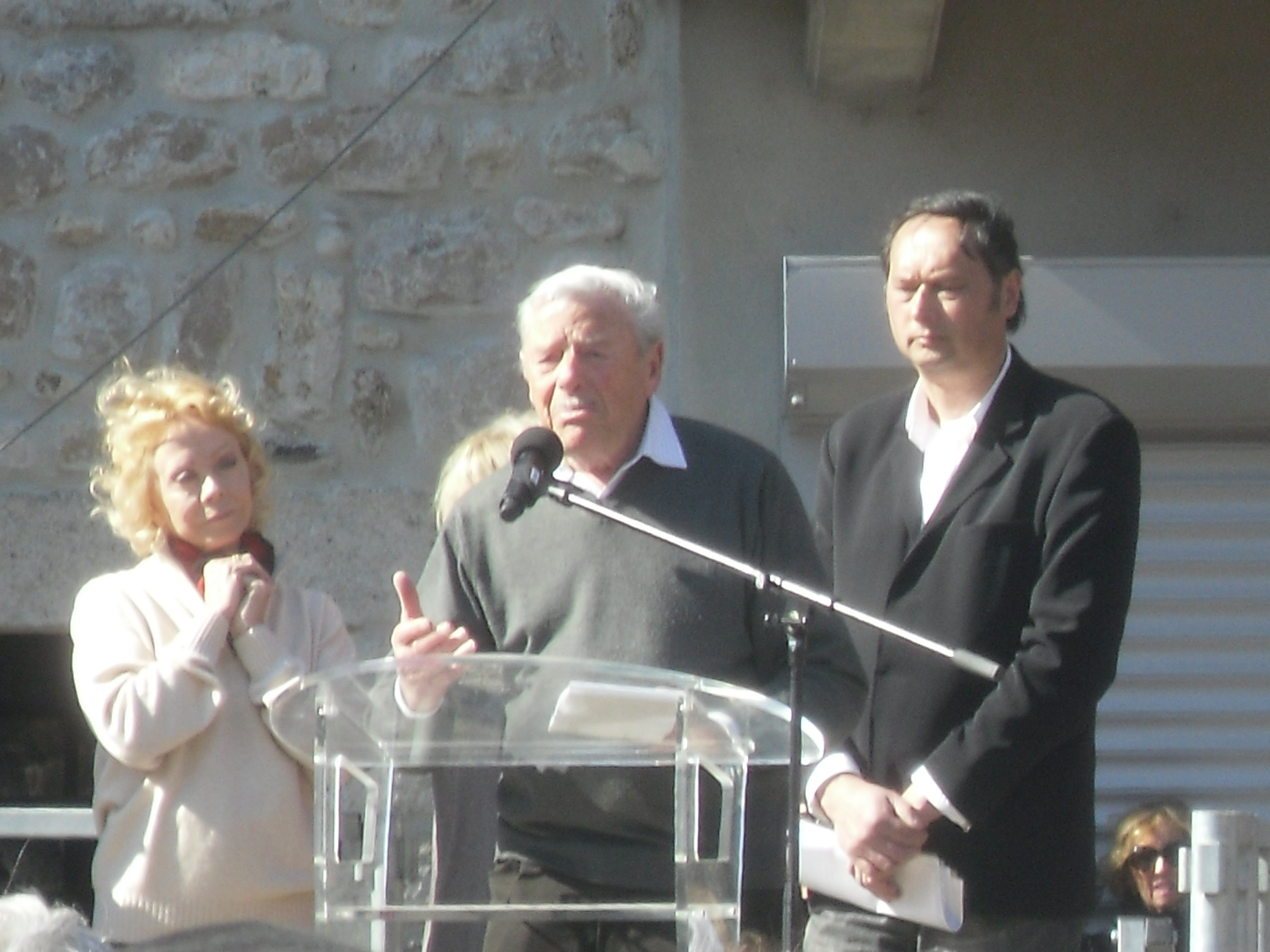
Isabelle Aubret, Pierre Tenenbaum, and Michel Pesenti at the funeral of Jean Ferrat

List of Successive Mayors of Antraigues-sur-Volane

From	To	Name	Party	Position
1820	1833	Jean Pierre Chabannes		
1965	1977	Jean Saussac	PCF	Artist (painter)
1977	2001	Michel Beyssade		
2001	2014	Michel Pesenti	DVG	
2014	2019	Gilles Doz		

== Demography ==
The inhabitants of the commune are known as Antraiguains or Antraiguaines or alternatively as Antraiguais or Antraiguaises in French.

Historical population

Year	Pop.	±% p.a.
1793	1,501	—
1800	1,521	+0.19%
1806	1,805	+2.89%
1821	1,825	+0.07%
1831	1,908	+0.45%
1836	2,029	+1.24%
1841	1,443	−6.59%
1846	1,521	+1.06%
1851	1,504	−0.22%
1856	1,505	+0.01%
1861	1,576	+0.93%
1866	1,413	−2.16%
1872	1,434	+0.25%
1876	1,495	+1.05%
1881	1,386	−1.50%
1886	1,413	+0.39%
1891	1,348	−0.94%
1896	1,411	+0.92%

Year	Pop.	±% p.a.
1901	1,329	−1.19%
1906	1,364	+0.52%
1911	1,193	−2.64%
1921	957	−2.18%
1926	880	−1.66%
1931	842	−0.88%
1936	791	−1.24%
1946	643	−2.05%
1954	583	−1.22%
1962	525	−1.30%
1968	521	−0.13%
1975	499	−0.61%
1982	521	+0.62%
1990	506	−0.36%
1999	498	−0.18%
2007	593	+2.21%
2012	539	−1.89%
2021	498	−0.88%

Source: EHESS and INSEE

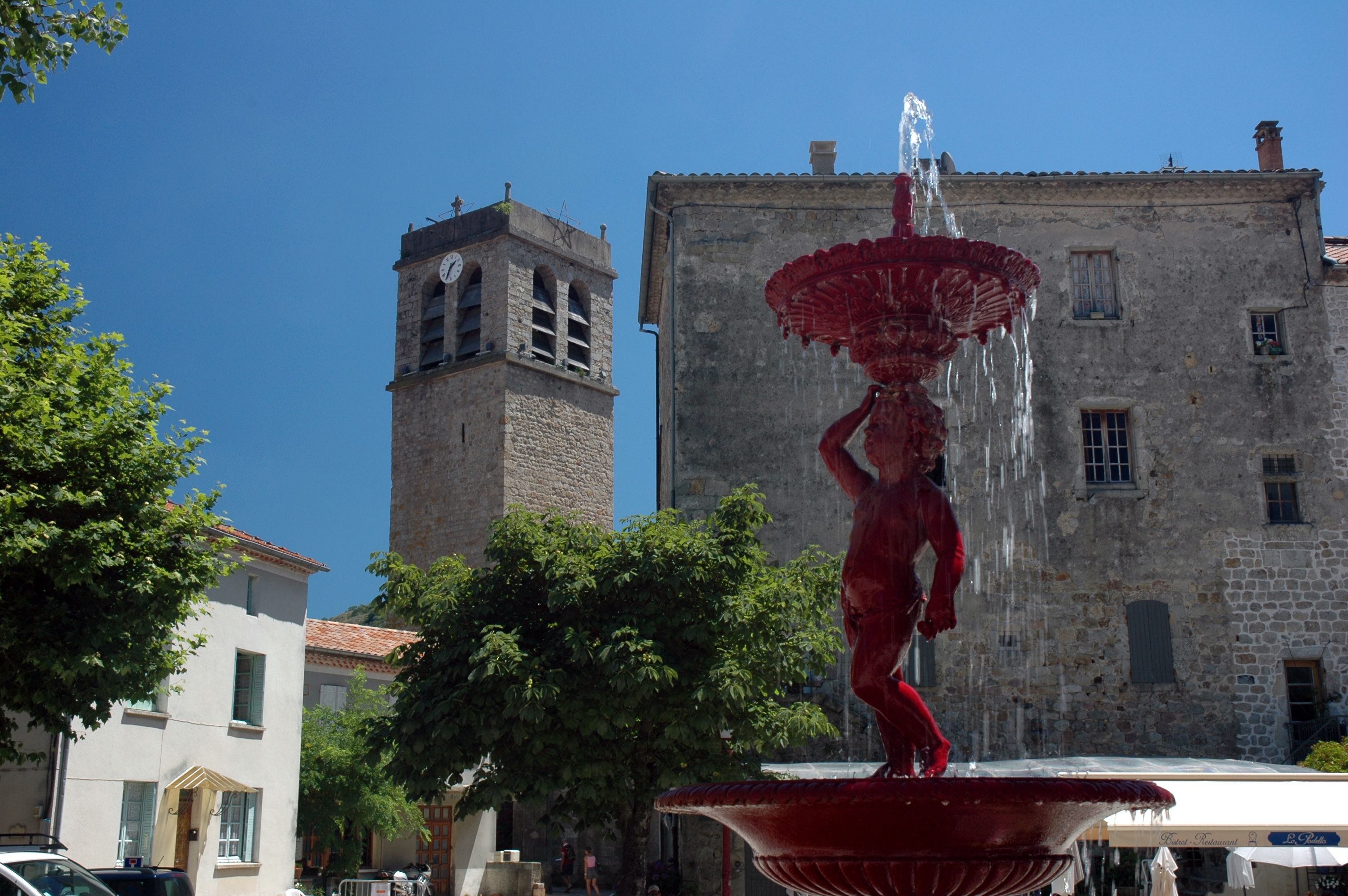
The Town Centre

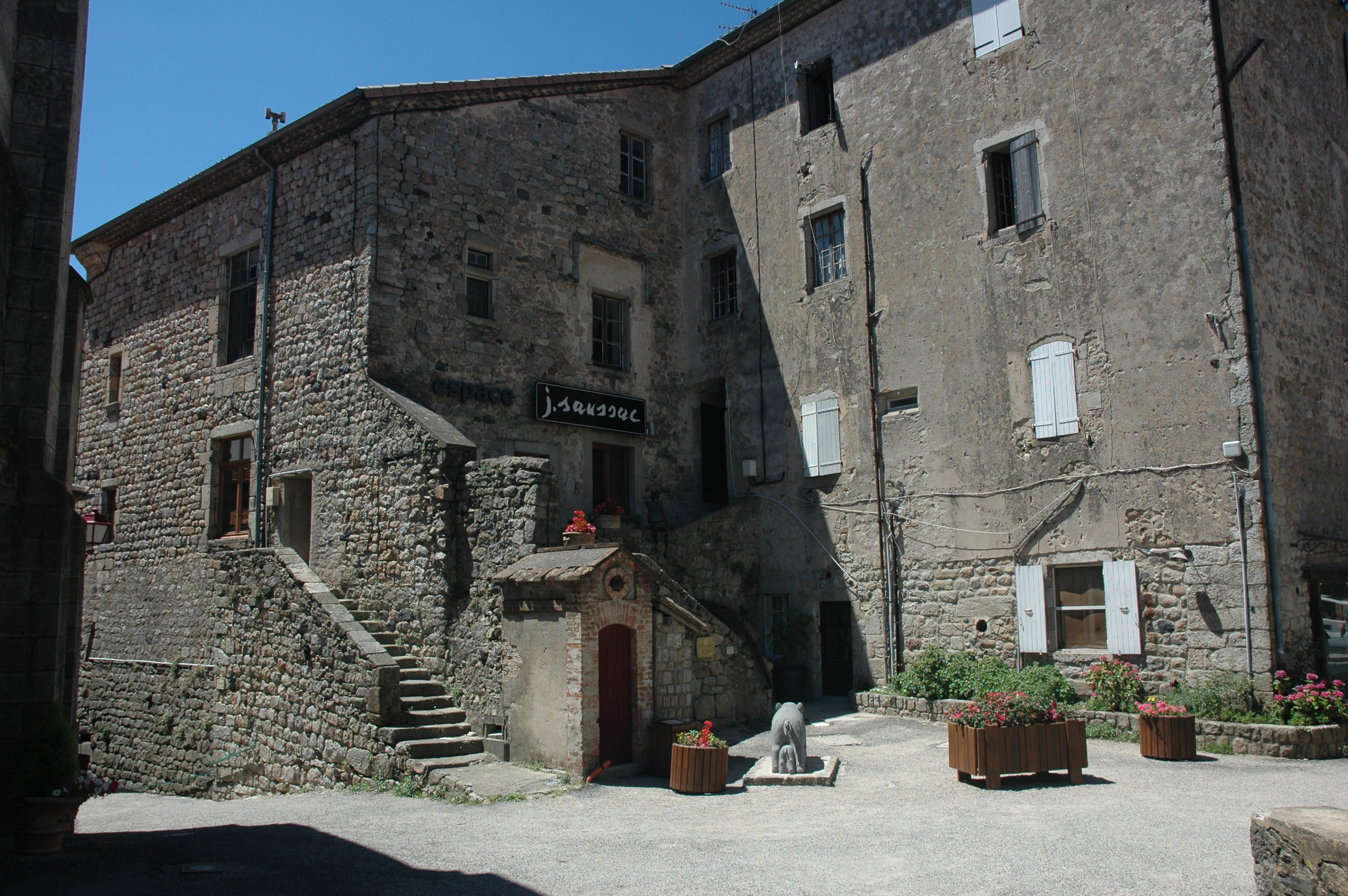
The Espace J. Saussac

== Culture and heritage ==
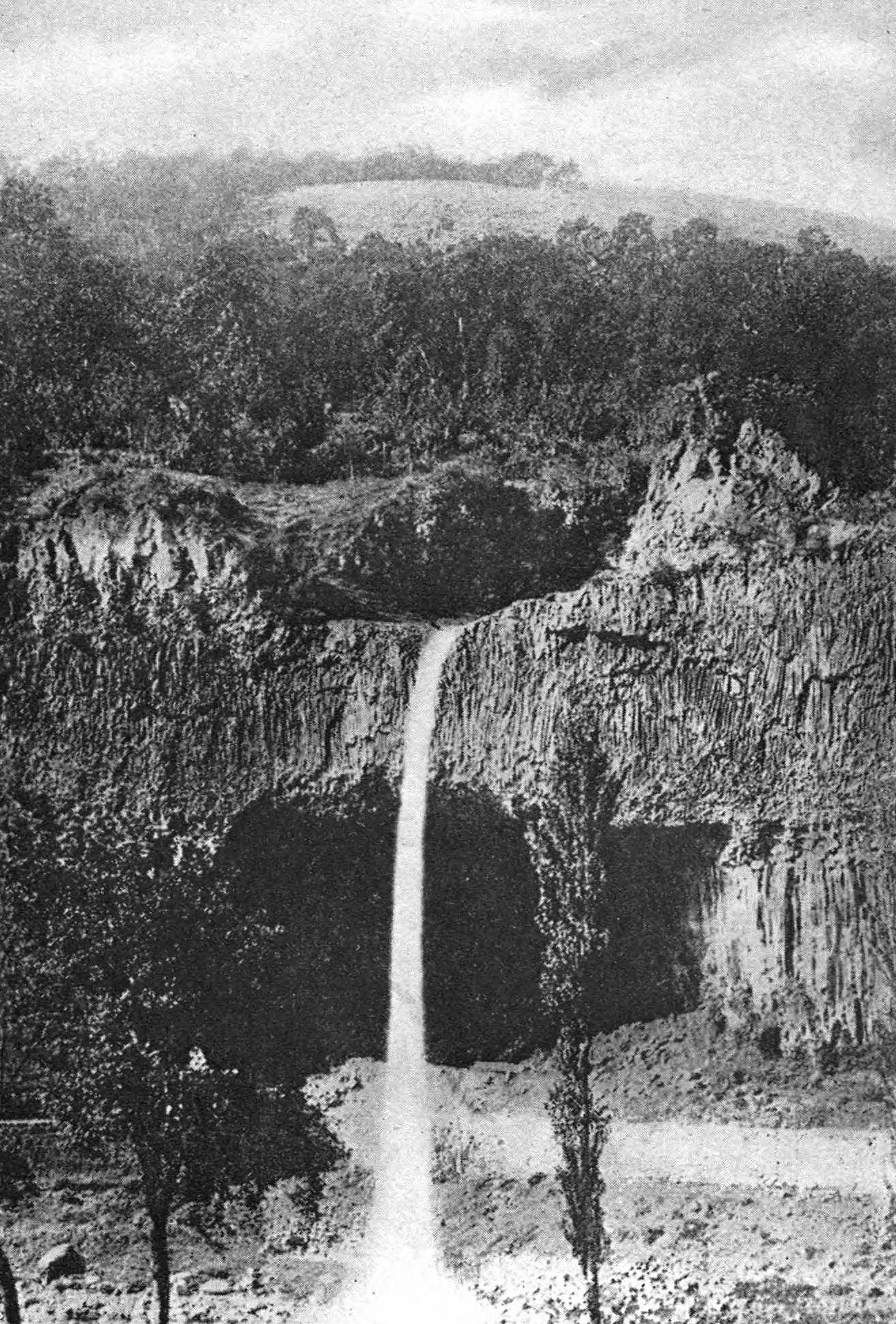
A Waterfall at Antraigues 1907

=== Civil heritage ===
- A Tower on the village hilltop

=== Religious heritage ===
- The Chapel of Saint-Roch
- The Parish Church contains a number of items that are registered as historical objects:
  - A Statue: The Virgin of the Immaculate Conception bringing down the serpent (19th century)
  - A Statue: Saint Roch (19th century)
  - A Statue: Saint Philomene (19th century)
  - A Statue: Saint Jean François Régis (19th century)
  - A Painting: Saint Bauzille, martyred deacon (19th century)

=== Environmental heritage ===
The commune has been an integral part of the Regional Natural Park of Monts d'Ardèche since its inception on 9 April 2001. The commune has two ZNIEFF type II areas in its territory named: "Line of the crest of the Mézilhac to the Escrinet Pass" "Watersheds of the Volane, the Dorne, and the Bézorgues"

The town also includes four ZNIEFF type I areas:

- "Rocks and moors of the volcano forest"
- "Streams of the Volane, the Mas, the Bise, and the Gamondes"
- "Plateau of Pradou and the Field of Mars"
- "Slopes of the Crau volcano"

== Panoramic view ==
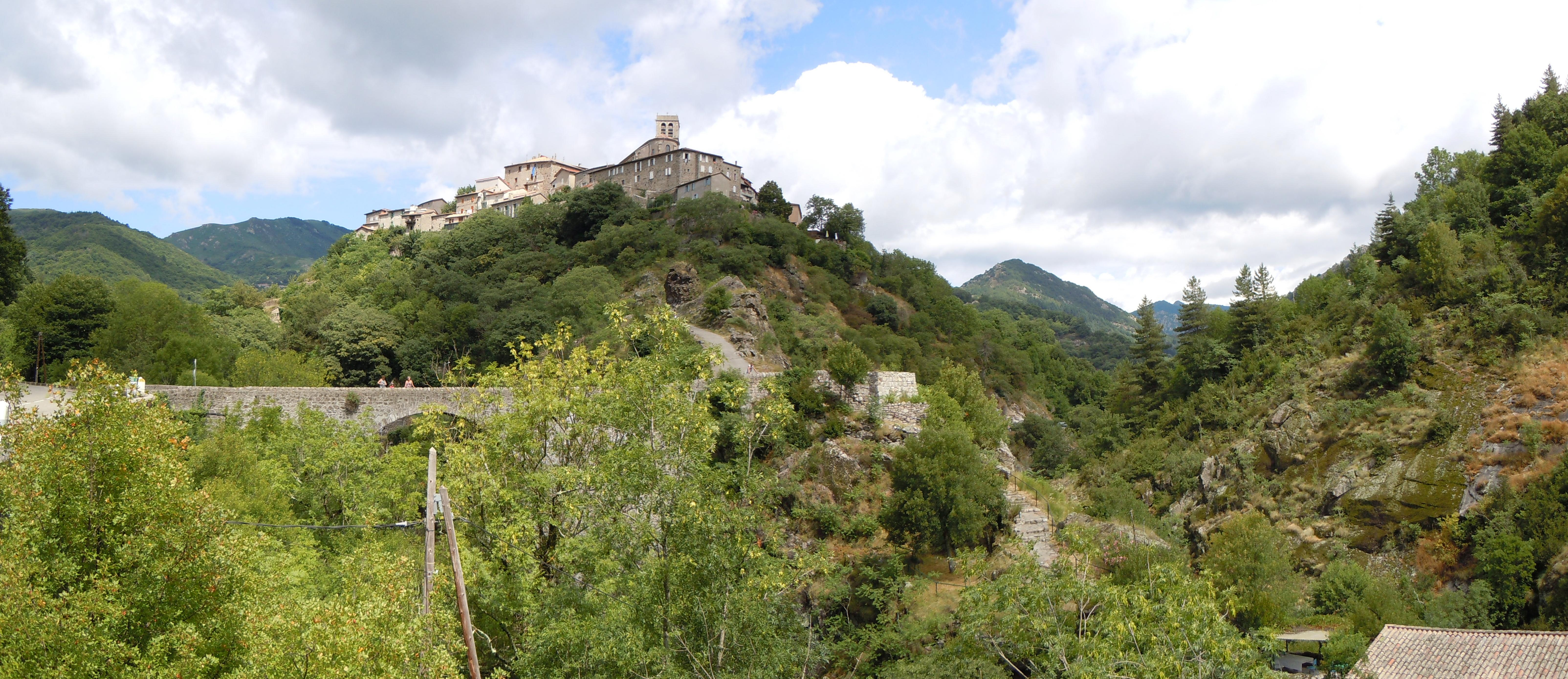
General View of Antraigues-sur-Volane.

== Notable People linked to the commune ==
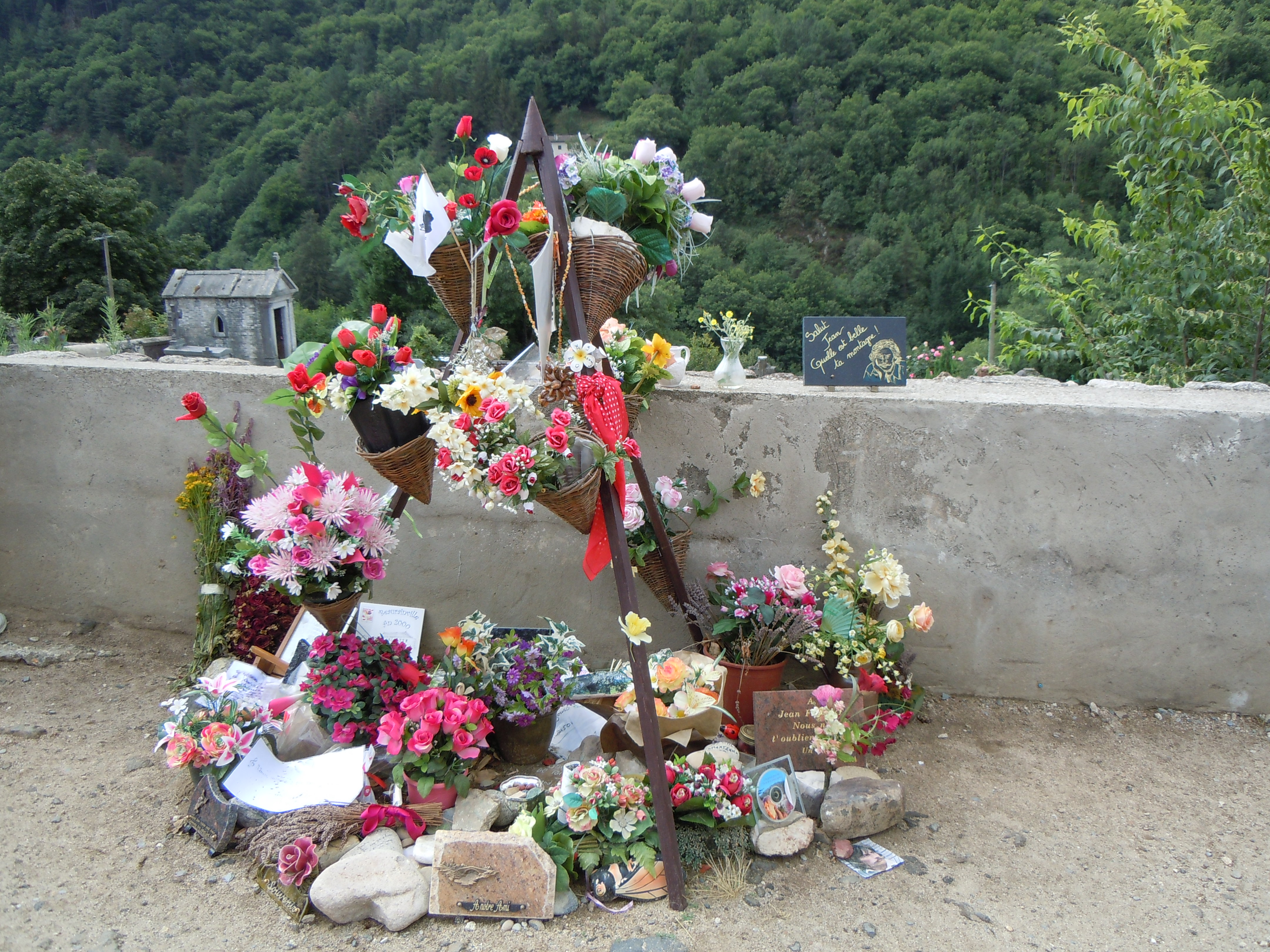
A memorial to Jean Ferrat at the entrance of the Antraigues cemetery.

- Jean-Louis Giraud-Soulavie (1752-1813), also known as Father Soulavie, geologist, diplomat, a native of Antraigues although born in Largentière, appointed vicar of Antraigues in 1776
- Louis-Alexandre de Launay, Count of Antraigues (1753-1812)
- Antoinette Saint-Huberty (1756-1812), famous opera singer, wife of Louis-Alexandre de Launay, Countess of Antraigues
- François-Joseph Gamon (1767-1832), French politician, born in Antraigues
- Edouard Froment (1884-1973), MP for the Ardeche and former President of the General Council of the Ardèche, died at Antraigues on 13 March 1973
- Jean Saussac (1922-2005), painter, former mayor of Antraigues and decorator for films including Le Vieux Fusil, Le Secret, and Les Grandes gueules
- Jean Ferrat (1930-2010), poet, lyricist, and French singer. Antraigues, where he settled in 1964, inspired him including his song La Montagne. He was deputy mayor during the 1970s. He is buried in the local cemetery with his brother André
- Christine Sèvres born Boissonnet (1931-1981), wife of Jean Ferrat
- Michel Teston (1944- ), General Counsel for the canton, Senator for the Ardeche, and former president of the General Council of the Ardèche
- Allain Leprest (1954-2011), French poet and singer, died in Antraigues on 15 August 2011

== See also ==
- Communes of the Ardèche department
- Jean Ferrat
