= Asperjoc =

Commune in Ardèche, France

- Part of Vallées-d'Antraigues-Asperjoc
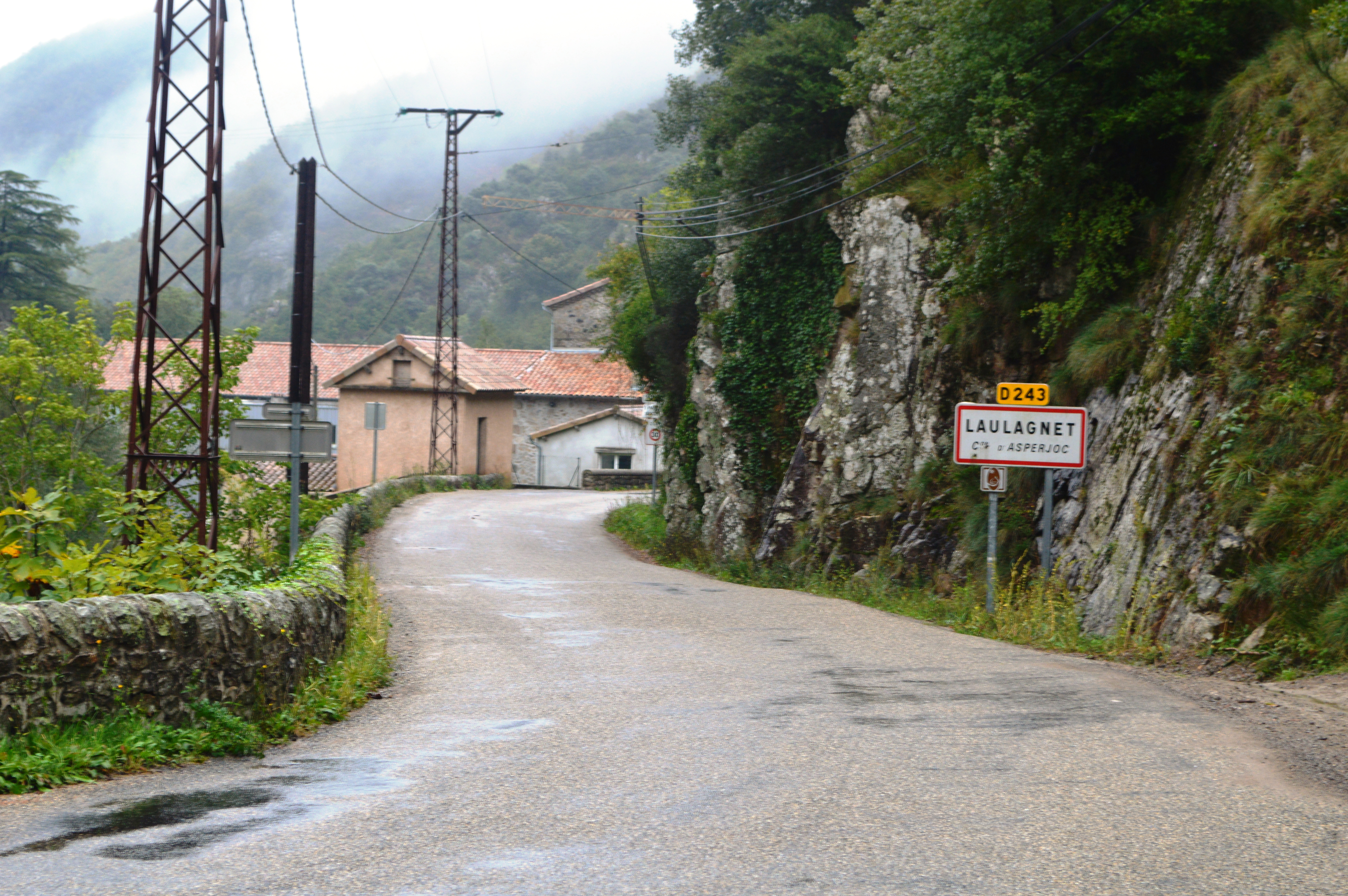
- The entry to Laulagnet
- Location of Asperjoc
- Location within France Location within Auvergne-Rhône-Alpes
- Coordinates: 44°41′09″N 4°21′35″E
- Country: France
- Region: Auvergne-Rhône-Alpes
- Department: Ardèche
- Arrondissement: Largentière
- Canton: Aubenas-1
- Commune: Vallées-d'Antraigues-Asperjoc
- Area^{1}: 8.47 km^{2} (3.27 sq mi)
- Elevation: 299 m (981 ft)
- Highest elevation: 879 m (2,884 ft)
- Lowest elevation: 278 m (912 ft)
- Population (2021): 360
  - Density: 43/km^{2} (110/sq mi)
- Time zone: UTC+01:00 (CET)
  - Summer (DST): UTC+02:00 (CEST)
- Postal code: 07600
- ^{1} French Land Register data, which excludes lakes, ponds, glaciers > 1 km^{2} (0.386 sq mi or 247 acres) and river estuaries.

Asperjoc (French pronunciation: [aspɛʁʒɔk]; Occitan: Asperjòc) is a former commune in the Ardèche department in the Auvergne-Rhône-Alpes region of southern France. On 1 January 2019, it was merged into the new commune Vallées-d'Antraigues-Asperjoc.

== Geography ==
Asperjoc is located some 2 km north by north-west of Aubenas and 18 km west by south-west of Privas. Access to the commune is by the D 578 road from Antraigues-sur-Volane in the north which passes down the eastern border of the commune and continues south to Vals-les-Bains. The D 243 branches off the D 578 in the south of the commune and goes north-west through the commune and continues to Labastide-sur-Bésorgues. The commune has no village called Asperjoc but has several hamlets: les Beaumelles, la Brugeyre, le Chastelas, le Fau, Laulagnet, le Pont de Bridou, le Pont de l-Huile, la Praye, le Raccourci, le Rigaudel, Thieure, Tras Chabanne et la Valette inférieure. The commune is rugged and alpine in nature with little or no arable land.

The Volane river forms the entire eastern border of the commune as it flows south to join the Ardèche south of Vals-les-Bains. The Besorgues flows from the north-west of the commune south-east forming part of the western border of the commune and gathering many tributaries in the commune before joining the Volane at the southern corner.

== Administration ==
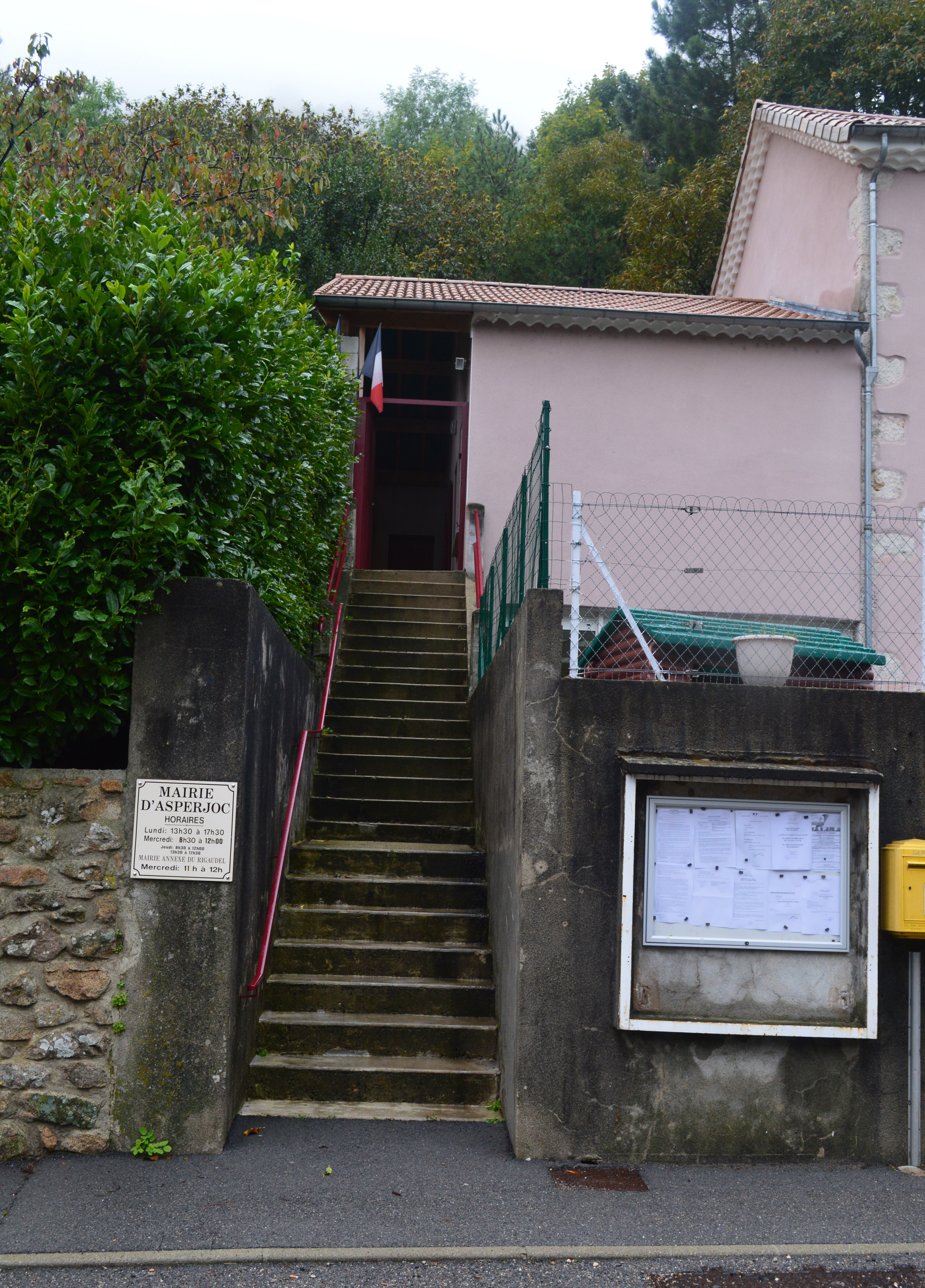
The Town Hall

List of Successive Mayors

From	To	Name
2001	2008	Louis Berthon
2008	2019	Alain Chiraussel

== Demography ==
The inhabitants of the commune are known as Asperjocois in French.

Historical population

Year	Pop.	±% p.a.
1793	523	—
1800	532	+0.24%
1806	540	+0.25%
1821	555	+0.18%
1831	671	+1.92%
1836	684	+0.38%
1841	666	−0.53%
1846	681	+0.45%
1851	807	+3.45%
1856	1,078	+5.96%
1861	1,104	+0.48%
1866	1,060	−0.81%
1872	739	−5.83%
1876	789	+1.65%
1881	836	+1.16%
1886	858	+0.52%
1891	866	+0.19%
1896	856	−0.23%

Year	Pop.	±% p.a.
1901	833	−0.54%
1906	806	−0.66%
1911	790	−0.40%
1921	679	−1.50%
1926	668	−0.33%
1931	635	−1.01%
1936	616	−0.61%
1946	538	−1.34%
1954	505	−0.79%
1962	453	−1.35%
1968	405	−1.85%
1975	407	+0.07%
1982	364	−1.58%
1990	370	+0.20%
1999	361	−0.27%
2007	336	−0.89%
2012	418	+4.46%
2021	360	−1.65%

Source: EHESS and INSEE

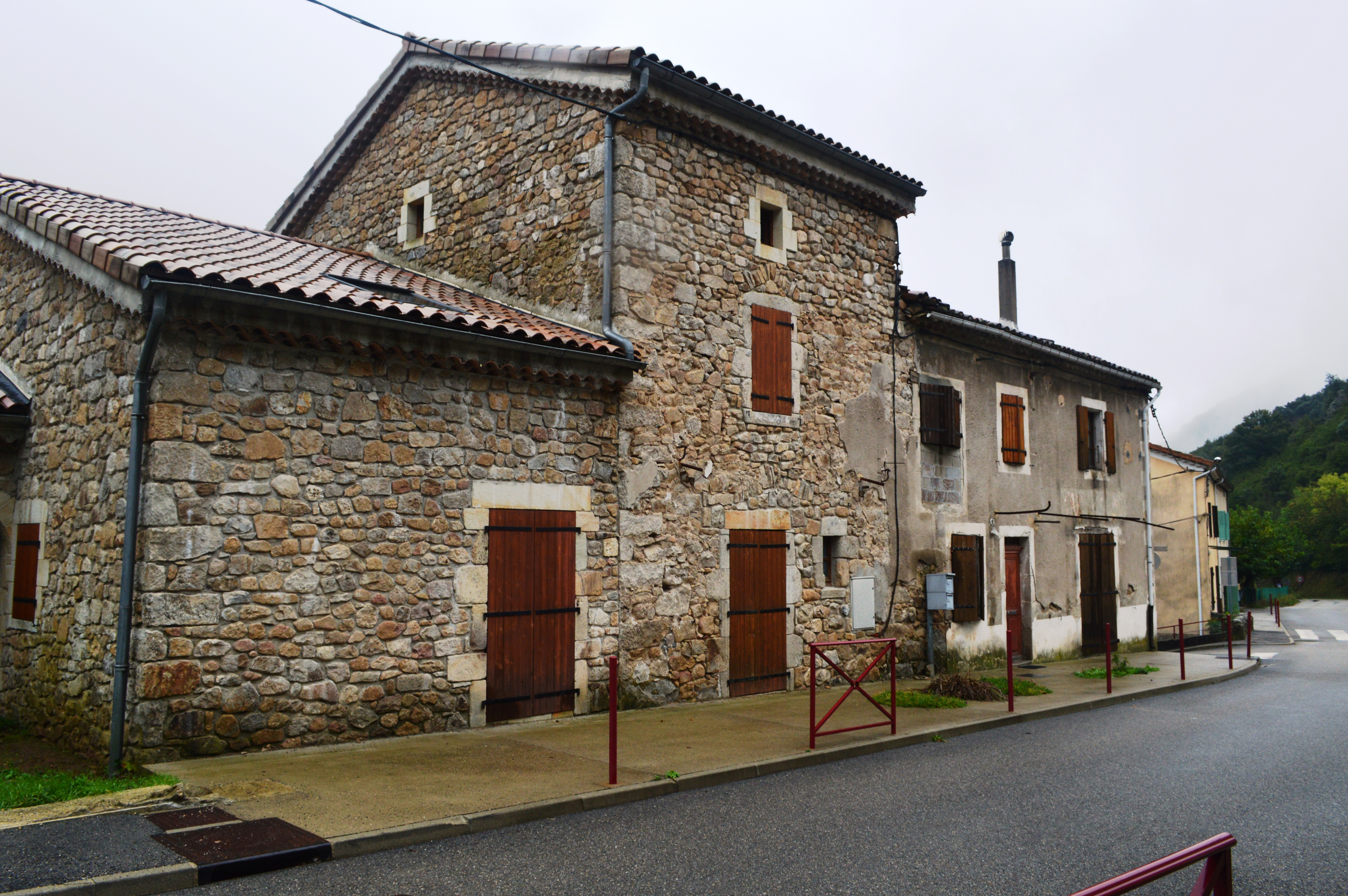
A street in Asperjoc

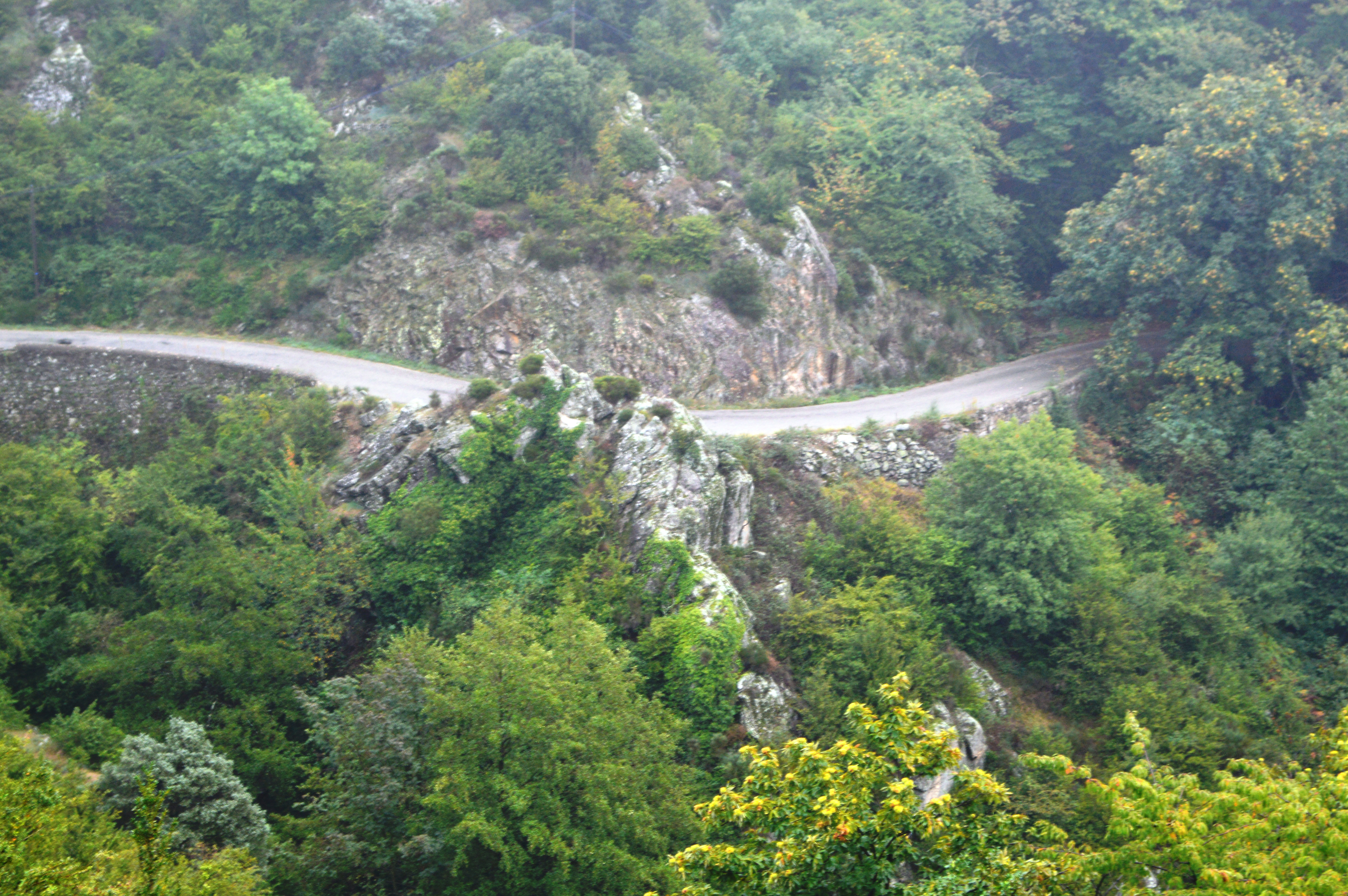
A road in Asperjoc

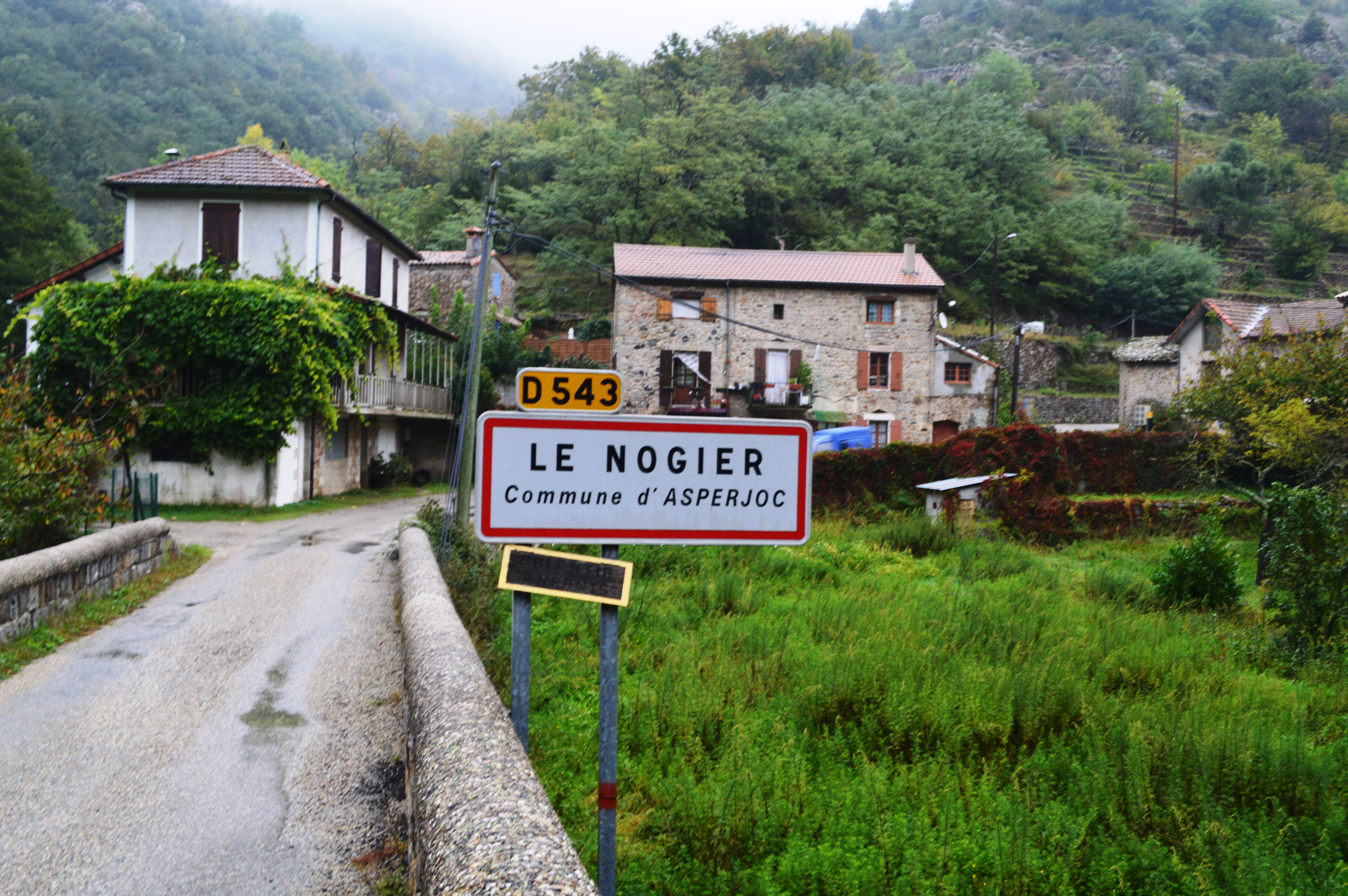
The entry to Le Nogier

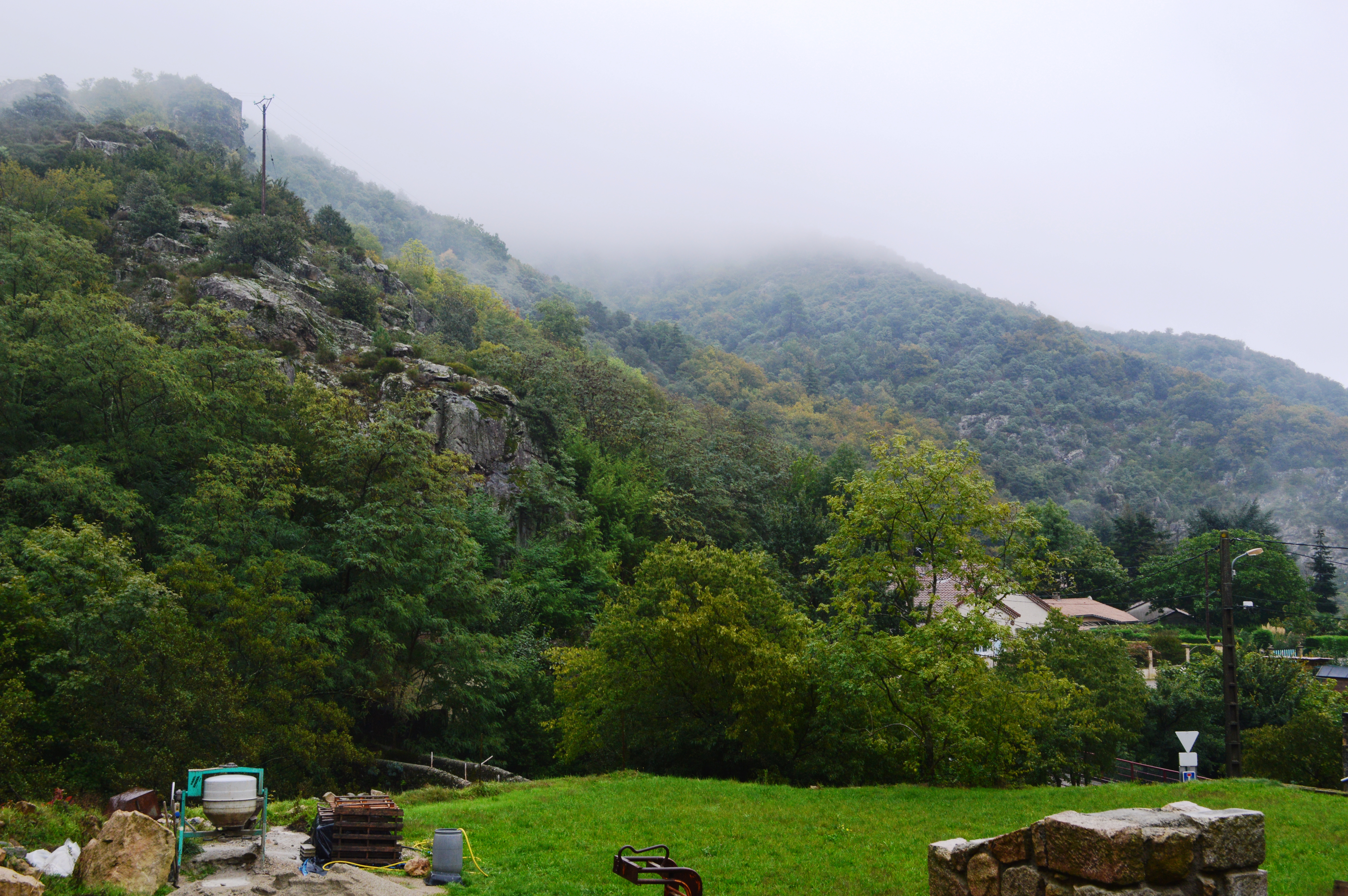
Asperjoc Landscape

== Sites and monuments ==
- Church from the 19th century
- La Chaise du Diable waterfall

== See also ==
- Communes of the Ardèche department
