= Aizac =

- Commune
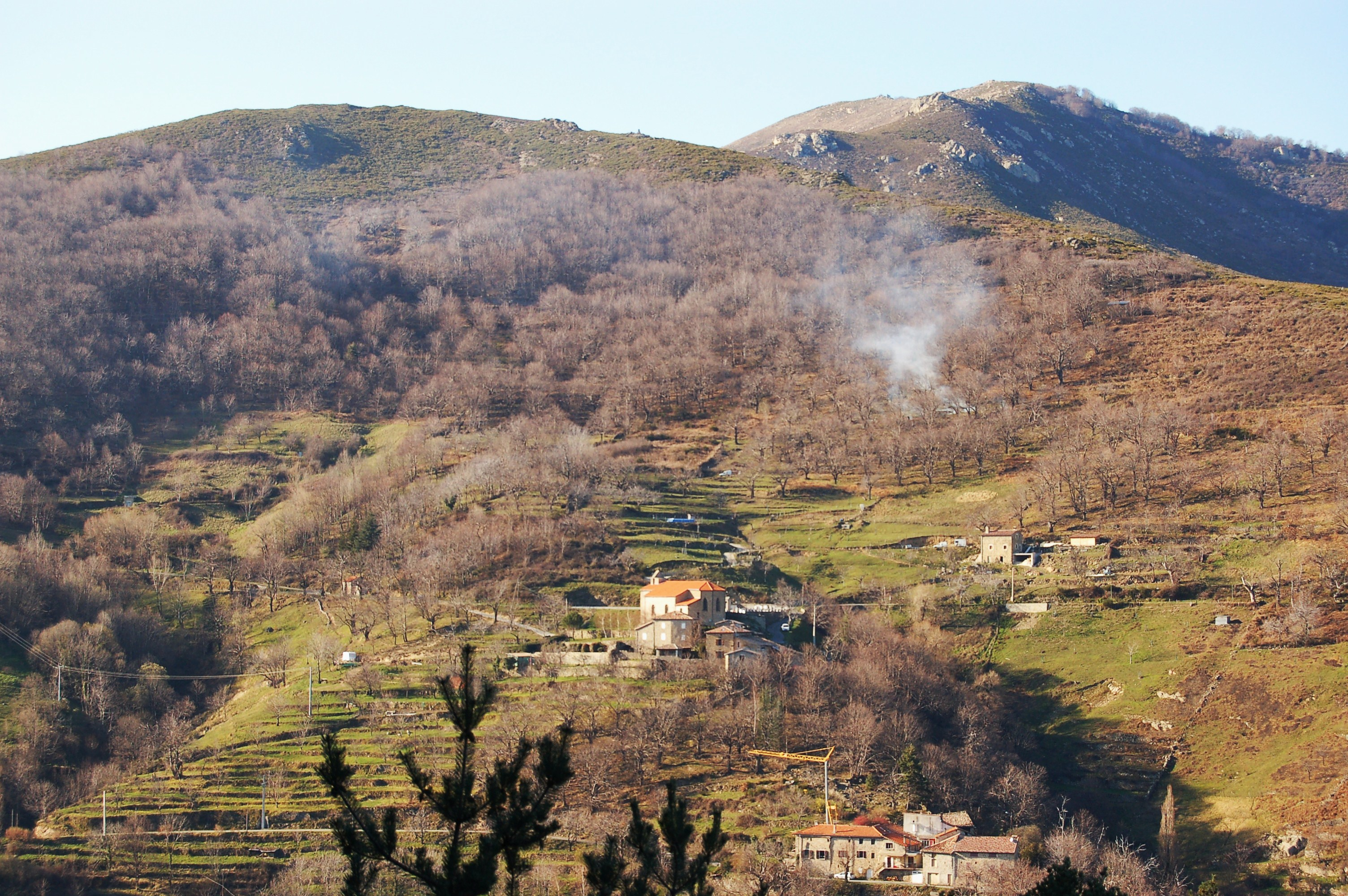
- A general view of Aizac
- Location of Aizac
- Location within France Location within Auvergne-Rhône-Alpes
- Coordinates: 44°42′55″N 4°19′44″E
- Country: France
- Region: Auvergne-Rhône-Alpes
- Department: Ardèche
- Arrondissement: Largentière
- Canton: Aubenas-1
- Intercommunality: Bassin d'Aubenas

Government
  - Mayor (2020–2026): Marie Christine Saussac
- Area^{1}: 6.65 km^{2} (2.57 sq mi)
- Elevation: 600 m (2,000 ft)
- Highest elevation: 1,200 m (3,900 ft)
- Lowest elevation: 420 m (1,380 ft)
- Population (2023): 169
  - Density: 25.4/km^{2} (65.8/sq mi)
- Time zone: UTC+01:00 (CET)
  - Summer (DST): UTC+02:00 (CEST)
- INSEE/Postal code: 07003 /07530
- ^{1} French Land Register data, which excludes lakes, ponds, glaciers > 1 km^{2} (0.386 sq mi or 247 acres) and river estuaries.

Aizac (French pronunciation: [ɛzak]) is a commune in the Ardèche department in the Auvergne-Rhône-Alpes region of southern France.

== Geography ==
Aizac is located some 30 km east of Langogne and 40 km west of Livron-sur-Drome close to the Monts d'Ardeche Regional Nature Park. Access to the commune is difficult with only three circuitous roads entering the commune. From Vals-les-Bains in the south the D578 goes north then left to the D243 which eventually comes close to the western border of the commune where there is a right turn to the D443 which enters the commune and joins the D254 at the village. The D254 road enters the commune from Labastide-sur-Besorgues in the north-west and continues through the commune exiting on the eastern side intersecting with the D578 which goes north and south. Other than small mountain roads no other roads enter the commune. The village is very small with only a few houses and there are a few other houses scattered through the commune.

There are many streams throughout the commune such as the Ruiseau des Fuels, the Bise, the Coupe, the Rousses, the Ribeyres, and the Sandron most of which flow to the Ardeche river in the south.

== Administration ==
List of Successive Mayors of Aizac

From	To	Name	Party
2001	2008	Madeleine Jouanny	DVG
2008	2020	Edmond Fargier	DVD
2020	Current	Marie Christine Saussac	

== Population ==
The inhabitants of the commune are known as Aizacois or Aizacoises in French.

Historical population
Year	Pop.	±% p.a.
1968	177	—
1975	137	−3.59%
1982	144	+0.71%
1990	156	+1.01%
1999	169	+0.89%
2007	162	−0.53%
2012	150	−1.53%
2017	169	+2.41%
2023	169	+0.00%
Source: INSEE

== Sites and Monuments ==
- Remains of Aizac volcano
- A Romanesque Church from the 11th century including a baptistry and font. The church has several items that are registered as historical objects:
  - A Statue: Saint Roch (18th century)
  - A Statue: Virgin and child (18th century)
  - An Altar (19th century)
  - A Stoup (17th century)
  - A Baptismal font (18th century)

== See also ==
- Communes of the Ardèche department
