= Saint-Andéol =

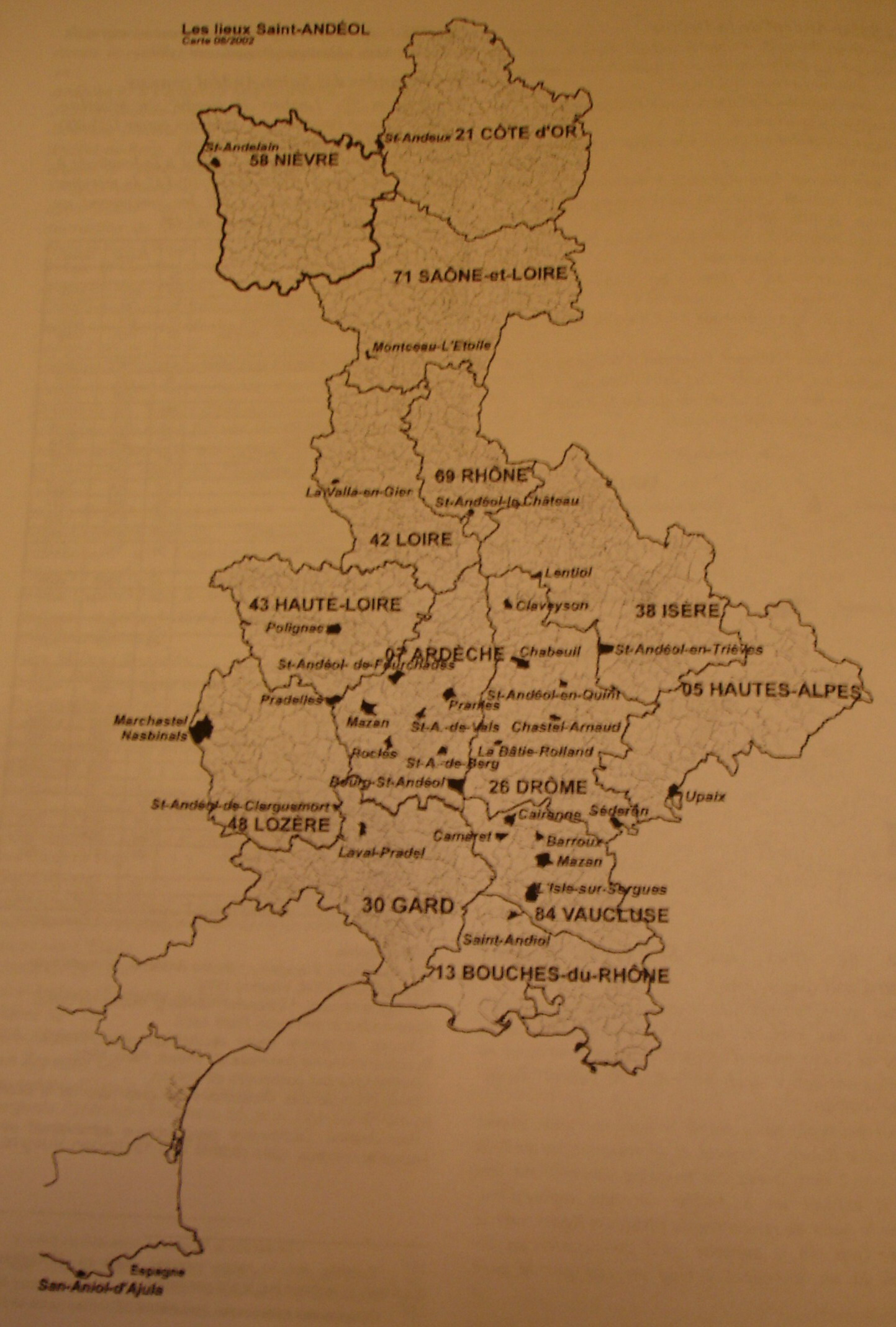
Map of places named Saint-Andéol in France

- Saint Andéol, 2nd Cty CE, a saint

Saint-Andéol is the name of a saint from whose name derives the title of several towns in France:

- Saint-Andéol, in the Drôme department
- Saint-Andéol, in the Isère department
- Saint-Andéol-de-Berg, in the Ardèche department
- Saint-Andéol-de-Bourlenc, was until 1923 the name of Saint-Andéol-de-Vals (Lozère)
- Saint-Andéol-de-Clerguemort, in the Lozère department
- Saint-Andéol-de-Fourchades, in the Ardèche department
- Saint-Andéol-de-Vals, in the Ardèche department
- Saint-Andéol-en-Quint, was from 1906 to 1936 the name of Saint-Andéol (Drôme)
- Saint-Andéol-et-Saint-Etienne-en-Quint, was until 1906 the name of Saint-Andéol (Drôme)
- Saint-Andéol-le-Château, in the Rhône department
