= Antraigues =

Antraigues may refer to:

- Antraigues-sur-Volane, a former commune of France
- Vallées-d'Antraigues-Asperjoc, a commune of France
- Louis-Alexandre de Launay, comte d'Antraigues (1753–1812), French pamphleteer

== See also ==
- Entraigues (disambiguation)
