= Entraigues =

Entraigues is the name or part of the name of several communes in France:

- Entraigues, in the Isère department
- Entraigues, in the Puy-de-Dôme department
- Entraigues-sur-la-Sorgue, in the Vaucluse department
- Antraigues-sur-Volane, in the Ardèche department
- Égliseneuve-d'Entraigues, in the Puy-de-Dôme department

== See also ==
- Antraigues (disambiguation)
- Maria Entraigues-Abramson (fl. 1990s–2010), Argentine-American singer, actress, and longevity activist
- Catherine Henriette de Balzac d'Entragues (1579–1633), mistress of Henry IV of France
