= Saint-Joseph-des-Bancs =

- Commune
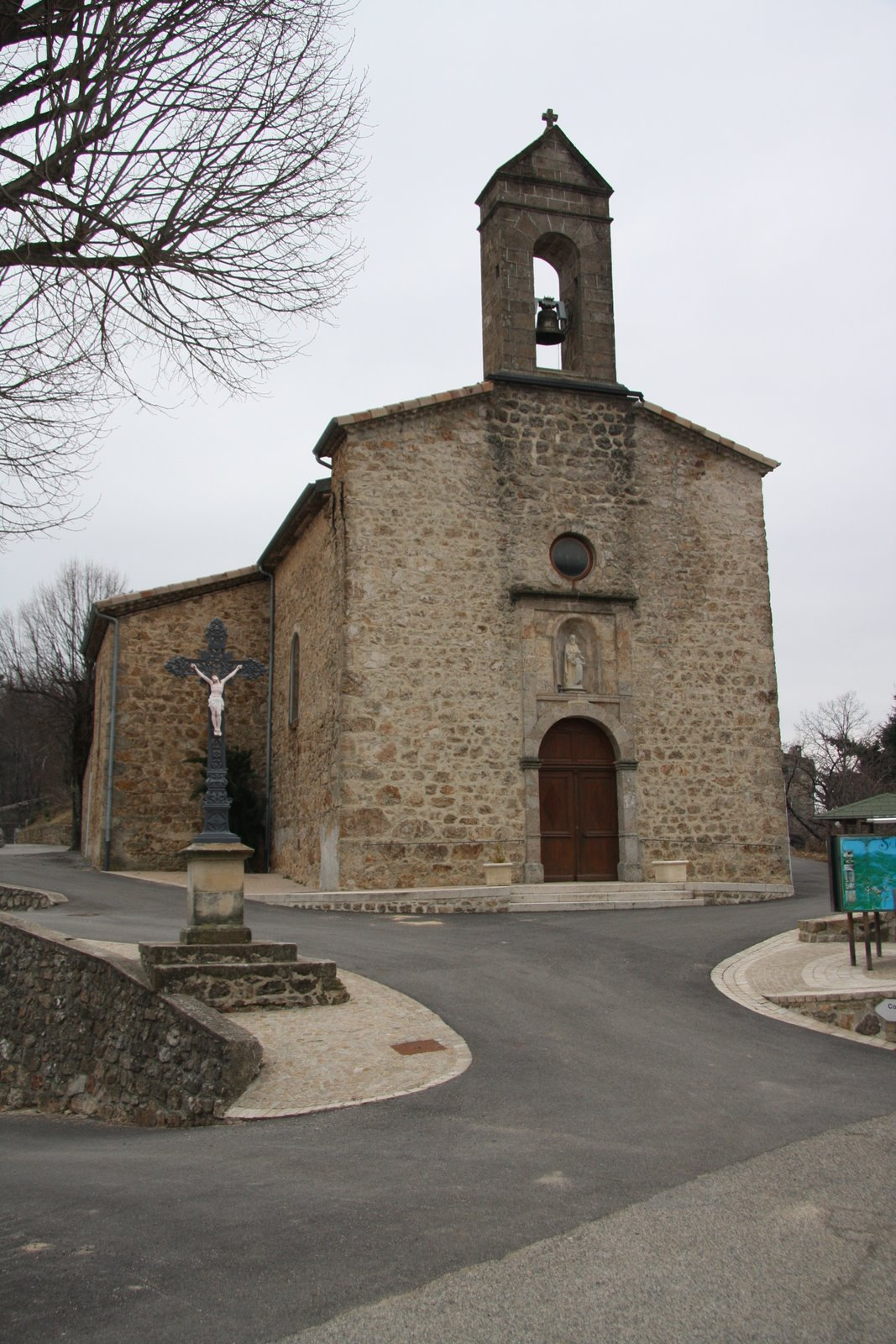
- The church in Saint-Joseph-des-Bancs
- Location of Saint-Joseph-des-Bancs
- Location within France Location within Auvergne-Rhône-Alpes
- Coordinates: 44°44′16″N 4°24′45″E
- Country: France
- Region: Auvergne-Rhône-Alpes
- Department: Ardèche
- Arrondissement: Largentière
- Canton: Aubenas-1

Government
  - Mayor (2020–2026): Jacques Sebastien
- Area^{1}: 12.89 km^{2} (4.98 sq mi)
- Elevation: 625 m (2,051 ft)
- Highest elevation: 1,294 m (4,245 ft)
- Lowest elevation: 547 m (1,795 ft)
- Population (2023): 200
  - Density: 16/km^{2} (40/sq mi)
- Time zone: UTC+01:00 (CET)
  - Summer (DST): UTC+02:00 (CEST)
- INSEE/Postal code: 07251 /07530
- ^{1} French Land Register data, which excludes lakes, ponds, glaciers > 1 km^{2} (0.386 sq mi or 247 acres) and river estuaries.

Saint-Joseph-des-Bancs (French pronunciation: [sɛ̃ ʒozɛf de bɑ̃]; Occitan: Lubancs) is a commune in the Ardèche department in southern France.

== Population ==
Historical population
Year	Pop.	±% p.a.
1968	188	—
1975	162	−2.10%
1982	160	−0.18%
1990	169	+0.69%
1999	186	+1.07%
2007	189	+0.20%
2012	190	+0.11%
2017	174	−1.74%
2023	200	+2.35%
Source: INSEE

== See also ==
- Communes of the Ardèche department
