= Juvinas =

- Commune
- Location of Juvinas
- Location within France Location within Auvergne-Rhône-Alpes
- Coordinates: 44°42′41″N 4°18′23″E
- Country: France
- Region: Auvergne-Rhône-Alpes
- Department: Ardèche
- Arrondissement: Largentière
- Canton: Aubenas-1

Government
  - Mayor (2020–2026): Jean-Claude Court
- Area^{1}: 8.43 km^{2} (3.25 sq mi)
- Elevation: 650 m (2,130 ft)
- Highest elevation: 1,062 m (3,484 ft)
- Lowest elevation: 400 m (1,300 ft)
- Population (2023): 187
  - Density: 22.2/km^{2} (57.5/sq mi)
- Time zone: UTC+01:00 (CET)
  - Summer (DST): UTC+02:00 (CEST)
- INSEE/Postal code: 07111 /07600
- ^{1} French Land Register data, which excludes lakes, ponds, glaciers > 1 km^{2} (0.386 sq mi or 247 acres) and river estuaries.

Juvinas is a commune located in the Ardèche department in the Auvergne-Rhône-Alpes region.

== Population ==
Historical population
Year	Pop.	±% p.a.
1968	181	—
1975	144	−3.21%
1982	138	−0.61%
1990	153	+1.30%
1999	149	−0.29%
2007	157	+0.66%
2012	173	+1.96%
2017	172	−0.12%
2023	187	+1.40%
Source: INSEE

== Famous features ==
A meteorite fell on the 15th of June 1821, and it was named the Juvinas meteorite. It fell in the hamlet of Libonès, at a place called “le Cros du Libonès” (in French). It is a eucrite, coming from the Vesta minor planet, the 4th asteroid by size from the main asteroid belt, between Jupiter and Mars. Half of the original recovered fall is still kept in the French national collection of meteorites at MNHN museum, in Paris, France. The remaining was kept in neighborhood family homes, but the lack of transmission of their origin through successive generations ended with the loss, by discarding, of most if not all of these therefore unidentified pieces.

== See also ==
- Communes of the Ardèche department
