= François-Joseph Gamon =

French politician, lawyer and poet

François-Joseph Gamon (6 April 1767 Antraigues-sur-Volane - 1 November 1832, Antraigues-sur-Volane) was a French politician, lawyer and poet.

Born into a Protestant family from Savoie, François-Joseph Gamon was the son of Joseph Gamon and Anne Bosc. He studied law in Toulouse, then became a lawyer in the same city. He acquired a local fame as a result of his flamboyant rhetoric in court.

== French Revolution ==
In 1791 Gamon was elected to the Legislative Assembly for the department of Ardèche as the substitute Valadier. After Valadier's resignation, Gamon replaced him in the Assembly from 3 January 1792. His made no particular mark and generally voted with the moderate deputies. He was re-elected on 5 September 1792 to the National Convention with 319 out of 392 votes, and aligned himself more clearly with the Girondins. At the trial of Louis XVI, he asked that the accused be heard before the promulgation of the decree of accusation against him, and vote for death with conditions. He was one of deputies most hostile to the Montagnards and extremists of the Paris Commune. On 10 March 1793 he mounted the tribune of the convention to denounce plots organized against the Girondins and reproached the Montagnards for filling the stands of the Assembly with their supporters. He thus attracted the hatred of Jean-Paul Marat.

Initially spared by the Insurrection of 31 May – 2 June 1793, he fought vehemently against this coup by signing a petition of protest with 75 Girondin deputies. As a result, he was soon named in a decree of accusation by the convention. However he escaped the proscription inflicted on his fellow petitioners; at the moment when his decree of arrest striking him proceeded to the vote, he absented himself from the Convention claimed that he needed to use the toilet, and was able to flee from Paris to Switzerland. He remained there for eighteen months, during which time he got married.

After the Thermidorean Reaction, Gamon was recalled to the convention, where he supported the reactionary policies of the majority; the restitution of the property of those who had been condemned under the Great Terror and severe punishment for those responsible for the Revolt of 1 Prairial Year III. He was even suspected of royalism after his name was discovered in the papers of an agent of the Comte de Provence named Lemaître. He managed to exonerate himself, but it is possible he was in the pay of Provence. He joined the Committee of Public Safety on 5 June 1795, in charge of munitions.

Under the Directory, five departments elected Gamon to the Council of Five Hundred, where he sat until the year VI among the moderates despite acquaintances with the royalists. Gamon was, according to one source, in the pay of the British government and was in contact with the royalist agent de Launay.

Gamon then served on the Court of cassation, then judge at the Court of Appeal of Nîmes after the Coup of 18 Brumaire.

== Under Napoleon and the Bourbons ==
In 1804, he received the Legion d'Honneur and became president of the criminal court of Ardèche. Two years later, he led a delegation from his department to congratulate Napoleon, who appointed him general counselor of Ardeche in 1808, then president of the Court of Nîmes in 1813. In 1812 he was elected to the Academy of Gard.

Removed from office after the Bourbon Restoration, he returned to them under the Hundred Days. On 11 May 1815 the district of Privas elected him to the House of Representatives by 32 votes out of 44 voters. During the session of this House he spoke only once after the battle of Waterloo, proposing the restoration of the Constitution of 1791, without indicating who he thought should take the Crown of France. Again removed from office with the return of the Bourbons, Gamon retired to his hometown until the law of 1816 banished the regicides from the kingdom. He fled to Switzerland, but managed to return to France in 1819 thanks to the protection of his friend Boissy d'Anglas.

== Literary works ==
In 1795 he published three tragedies - Cleopâtre (1788), Charlotte Corday (1795) and Beaurepaire (1806), while two others, Tibère and Adonais, remained unpublished. In 1817 he published Les sept premiers livres du Télémaque, a verse rendition of part of the famous novel Les Aventures de Télémaque by François Fénelon.

He died in his native town in 1832 at the age of 65.
