= Michel Teston =

French politician

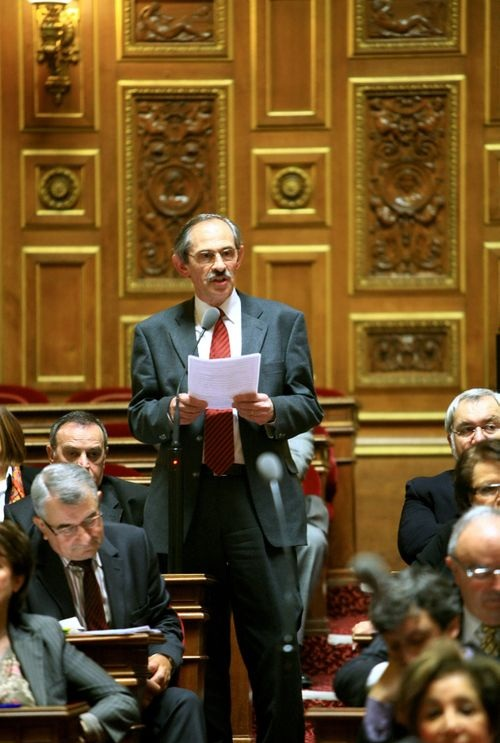
Michel Teston

Michel Teston (born 20 July 1944) is a former French politician and former member of the Senate of France, having represented the Ardèche department until 2014. He is a member of the Socialist Party.

== Career ==
His first position was as the General Counsel of his home township of Antraigues-sur-Volane, he was elected Chairman of the General Council of the Ardèche in 1998 (re-elected in 2001 and 2004), which he resigned in March 2006. His successor is Pascal Terrasse, his former Vice-President.

He was first elected to the senate on September 27, 1998. He was reelected for a second term on September 21, 2008, receiving a majority of the votes cast. He was not a candidate for re-election in 2014.

He was a former director of broadcasting (TDF) for the Central East region, and in this capacity from 2004 to 2006 he chaired the Information Technology and Communication Committee of the Assembly of France.

He is a member of the parliamentary mission Deindustrialisation territories and has served on the joint committee to ban shale gas. The Socialist Group of the Senate appointed him as leader for postal and transportation issues.

As part of the mission on nuclear security, he participated in the inspection of plants in Nogent-sur-Seine and Tricastin.

Teston is the grandson of Edward Froment, a socialist (SFIO) and member of parliament from 1932 to 1951, who also served as Chairman of the General Council of the Ardèche. He was one of 80 members of parliament who on July 10, 1940 voted against granting full powers to Marshal Philippe Pétain.
