= Saint-Julien-du-Serre =

- Commune
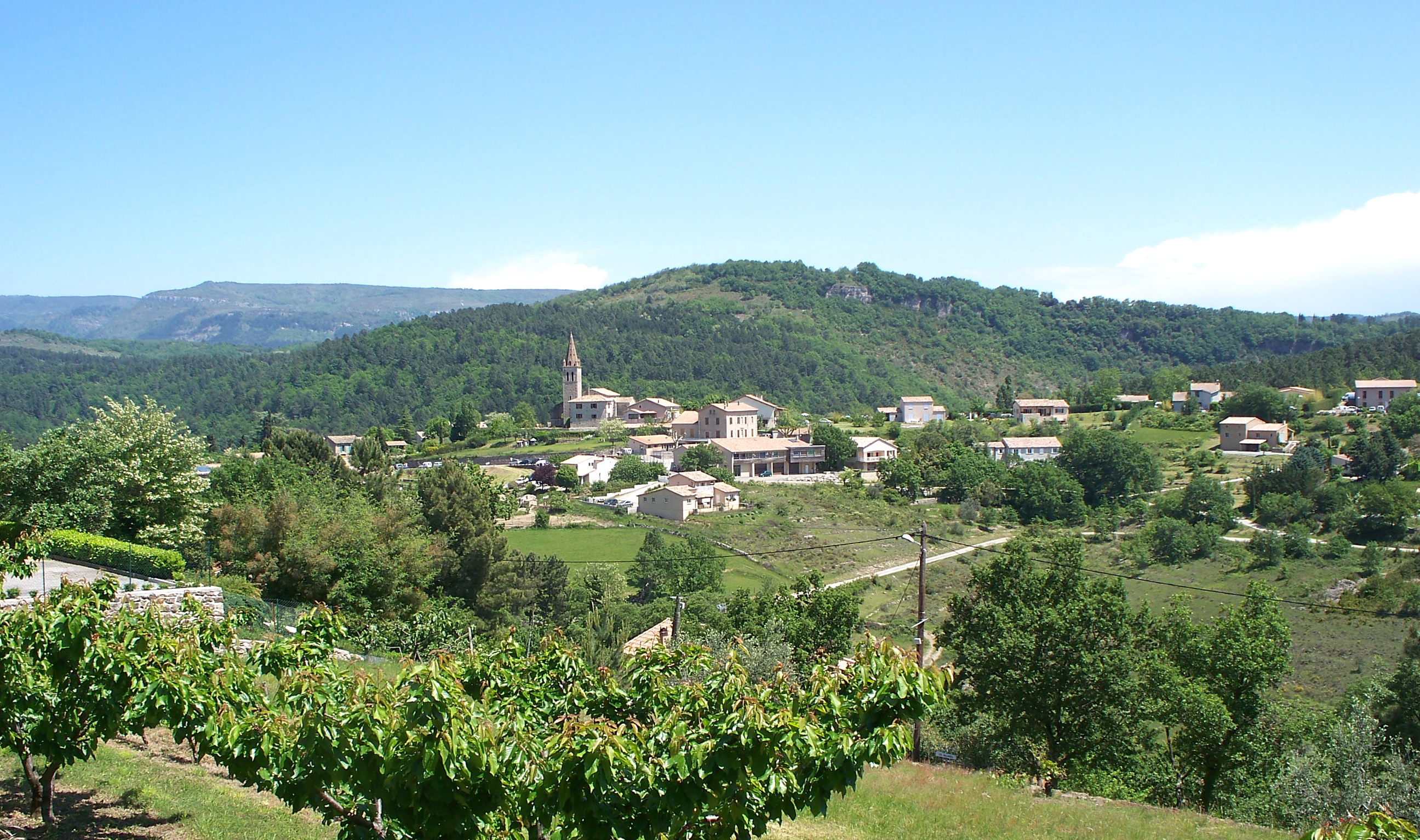
- A general view of Saint-Julien-du-Serre

- Coat of arms
- Location of Saint-Julien-du-Serre
- Location within France Location within Auvergne-Rhône-Alpes
- Coordinates: 44°39′28″N 4°24′43″E
- Country: France
- Region: Auvergne-Rhône-Alpes
- Department: Ardèche
- Arrondissement: Largentière
- Canton: Aubenas-1

Government
  - Mayor (2020–2026): Jean-Luc Arnaud
- Area^{1}: 9.78 km^{2} (3.78 sq mi)
- Elevation: 350 m (1,150 ft)
- Highest elevation: 482 m (1,581 ft)
- Lowest elevation: 224 m (735 ft)
- Population (2023): 879
  - Density: 89.9/km^{2} (233/sq mi)
- Time zone: UTC+01:00 (CET)
  - Summer (DST): UTC+02:00 (CEST)
- INSEE/Postal code: 07254 /07200
- ^{1} French Land Register data, which excludes lakes, ponds, glaciers > 1 km^{2} (0.386 sq mi or 247 acres) and river estuaries.

Saint-Julien-du-Serre (French pronunciation: [sɛ̃ ʒyljɛ̃ dy sɛʁ]; Occitan: Sant Julian delh Sèrre) is a commune in the Ardèche department in southern France.

== Population ==
Historical population
Year	Pop.	±% p.a.
1968	261	—
1975	289	+1.47%
1982	442	+6.26%
1990	689	+5.71%
1999	711	+0.35%
2007	830	+1.95%
2012	830	+0.00%
2017	879	+1.15%
2023	879	+0.00%
Source: INSEE

== See also ==
- Communes of the Ardèche department
