= Vallées-d'Antraigues-Asperjoc =

- Commune
- Location of Vallées-d'Antraigues-Asperjoc
- Location within France Location within Auvergne-Rhône-Alpes
- Coordinates: 44°43′09″N 4°21′30″E
- Country: France
- Region: Auvergne-Rhône-Alpes
- Department: Ardèche
- Arrondissement: Largentière
- Canton: Aubenas-1
- Intercommunality: Bassin d'Aubenas
- Area^{1}: 21.93 km^{2} (8.47 sq mi)
- Highest elevation: 1,344 m (4,409 ft)
- Lowest elevation: 372 m (1,220 ft)
- Population (2023): 845
  - Density: 38.5/km^{2} (99.8/sq mi)
- Time zone: UTC+01:00 (CET)
  - Summer (DST): UTC+02:00 (CEST)
- INSEE/Postal code: 07011 /07530, 07600
- ^{1} French Land Register data, which excludes lakes, ponds, glaciers > 1 km^{2} (0.386 sq mi or 247 acres) and river estuaries.

Vallées-d'Antraigues-Asperjoc (Occitan: Valladas-d'Antraigues-Asperjoc) is a commune in the Ardèche department in southern France. The municipality was established on 1 January 2019 by merger of the former communes of Antraigues-sur-Volane and Asperjoc.

== See also ==
- Communes of the Ardèche department
