= Labégude =

- Commune
- Location of Labégude
- Location within France Location within Auvergne-Rhône-Alpes
- Coordinates: 44°38′45″N 4°22′11″E
- Country: France
- Region: Auvergne-Rhône-Alpes
- Department: Ardèche
- Arrondissement: Largentière
- Canton: Aubenas-1

Government
  - Mayor (2020–2026): Jean-Yves Ponthier
- Area^{1}: 3.12 km^{2} (1.20 sq mi)
- Elevation: 242 m (794 ft)
- Highest elevation: 520 m (1,710 ft)
- Lowest elevation: 226 m (741 ft)
- Population (2023): 1,397
  - Density: 448/km^{2} (1,160/sq mi)
- Time zone: UTC+01:00 (CET)
  - Summer (DST): UTC+02:00 (CEST)
- INSEE/Postal code: 07116 /07200
- ^{1} French Land Register data, which excludes lakes, ponds, glaciers > 1 km^{2} (0.386 sq mi or 247 acres) and river estuaries.

Labégude (French pronunciation: [labeɡyd]; Occitan: La Beguda) is a commune in the Ardèche department in the Auvergne-Rhône-Alpes region in southern France.

== Population ==
Historical population
Year	Pop.	±% p.a.
1968	1,784	—
1975	1,786	+0.02%
1982	1,695	−0.74%
1990	1,401	−2.35%
1999	1,342	−0.48%
2007	1,364	+0.20%
2012	1,367	+0.04%
2017	1,393	+0.38%
2023	1,397	+0.05%
Source: INSEE

== See also ==
- Communes of the Ardèche department
