= Saint-Andéol, Drôme =

Saint-Andéol
- Commune
- Location of Saint-Andéol
- Location within France Location within Auvergne-Rhône-Alpes
- Coordinates: 44°48′42″N 5°16′08″E
- Country: France
- Region: Auvergne-Rhône-Alpes
- Department: Drôme
- Arrondissement: Die
- Canton: Le Diois
- Intercommunality: Diois

Government
  - Mayor (2024–2026): Françoise Bronchart-Mengoni
- Area^{1}: 13.37 km^{2} (5.16 sq mi)
- Elevation: 450 m (1,480 ft)
- Highest elevation: 1,122 m (3,681 ft)
- Lowest elevation: 432 m (1,417 ft)
- Population (2023): 82
  - Density: 6.1/km^{2} (16/sq mi)
- Time zone: UTC+01:00 (CET)
  - Summer (DST): UTC+02:00 (CEST)
- INSEE/Postal code: 26291 /26150
- ^{1} French Land Register data, which excludes lakes, ponds, glaciers > 1 km^{2} (0.386 sq mi or 247 acres) and river estuaries.

Saint-Andéol (French pronunciation: [sɛ̃.t‿ɑ̃deɔl]; Vivaro-Alpine: Sant Andiòu) is a commune in the Drôme department in southeastern France.

== Population ==
Historical population
Year	Pop.	±% p.a.
1968	55	—
1975	34	−6.64%
1982	27	−3.24%
1990	23	−1.98%
1999	34	+4.44%
2007	51	+5.20%
2012	58	+2.61%
2017	83	+7.43%
2023	82	−0.20%
Source: INSEE

== See also ==
- Communes of the Drôme department
- Parc naturel régional du Vercors
