= Genestelle =

- Commune
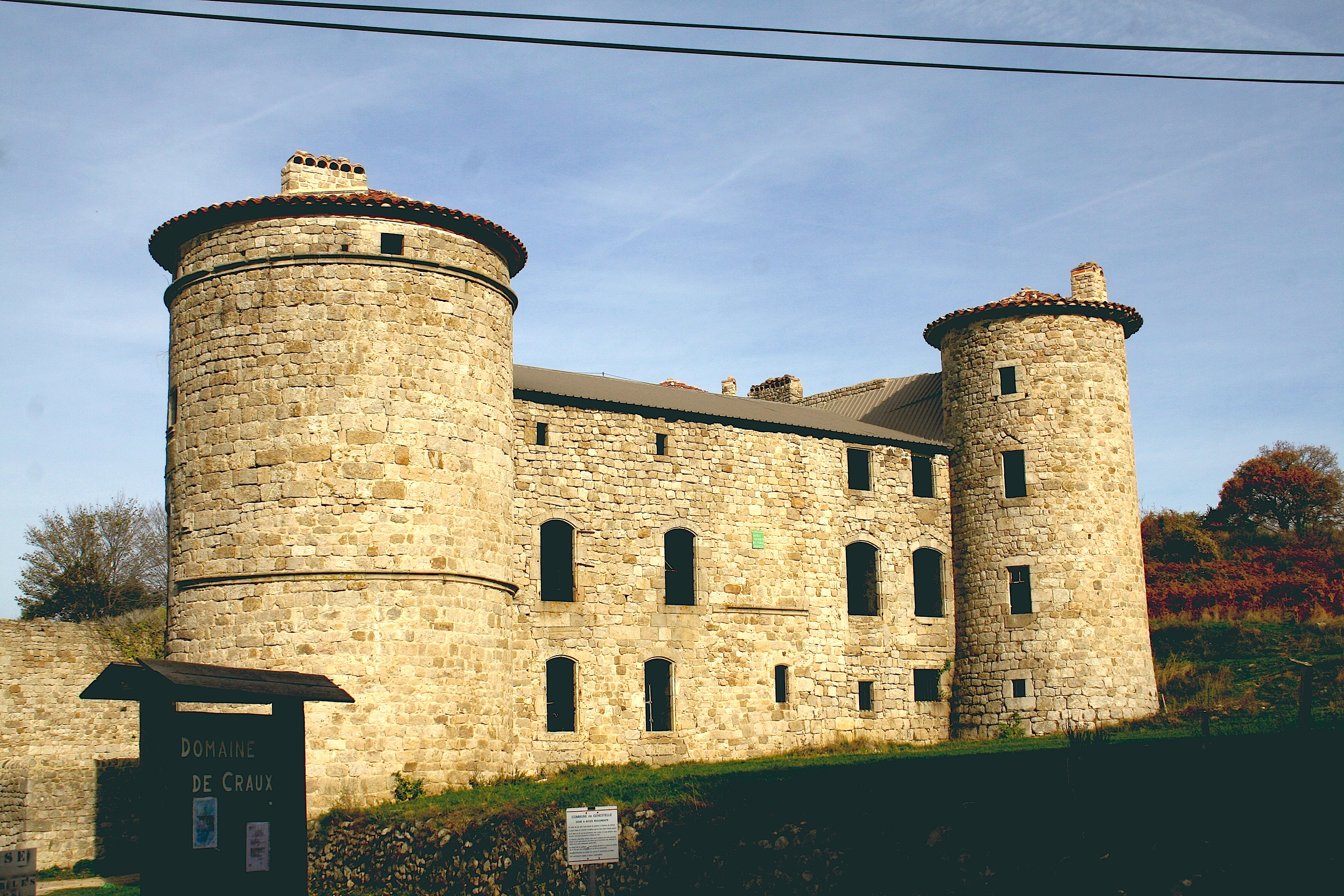
- Château de Craux
- Location of Genestelle
- Location within France Location within Auvergne-Rhône-Alpes
- Coordinates: 44°43′10″N 4°23′39″E
- Country: France
- Region: Auvergne-Rhône-Alpes
- Department: Ardèche
- Arrondissement: Largentière
- Canton: Aubenas-1

Government
  - Mayor (2020–2026): Jean-François Durand
- Area^{1}: 21.43 km^{2} (8.27 sq mi)
- Elevation: 675 m (2,215 ft)
- Highest elevation: 1,345 m (4,413 ft)
- Lowest elevation: 349 m (1,145 ft)
- Population (2023): 266
  - Density: 12.4/km^{2} (32.1/sq mi)
- Time zone: UTC+01:00 (CET)
  - Summer (DST): UTC+02:00 (CEST)
- INSEE/Postal code: 07093 /07530
- ^{1} French Land Register data, which excludes lakes, ponds, glaciers > 1 km^{2} (0.386 sq mi or 247 acres) and river estuaries.

Genestelle (French pronunciation: [ʒənɛstɛl]; Occitan: Ginestèla) is a commune in the Ardèche department in southern France.

== Population ==
Historical population
Year	Pop.	±% p.a.
1968	303	—
1975	271	−1.58%
1982	268	−0.16%
1990	260	−0.38%
1999	269	+0.38%
2007	279	+0.46%
2012	291	+0.85%
2017	276	−1.05%
2023	266	−0.61%
Source: INSEE

== See also ==
- Communes of the Ardèche department
