= Saint-Andéol-de-Vals =

- Commune
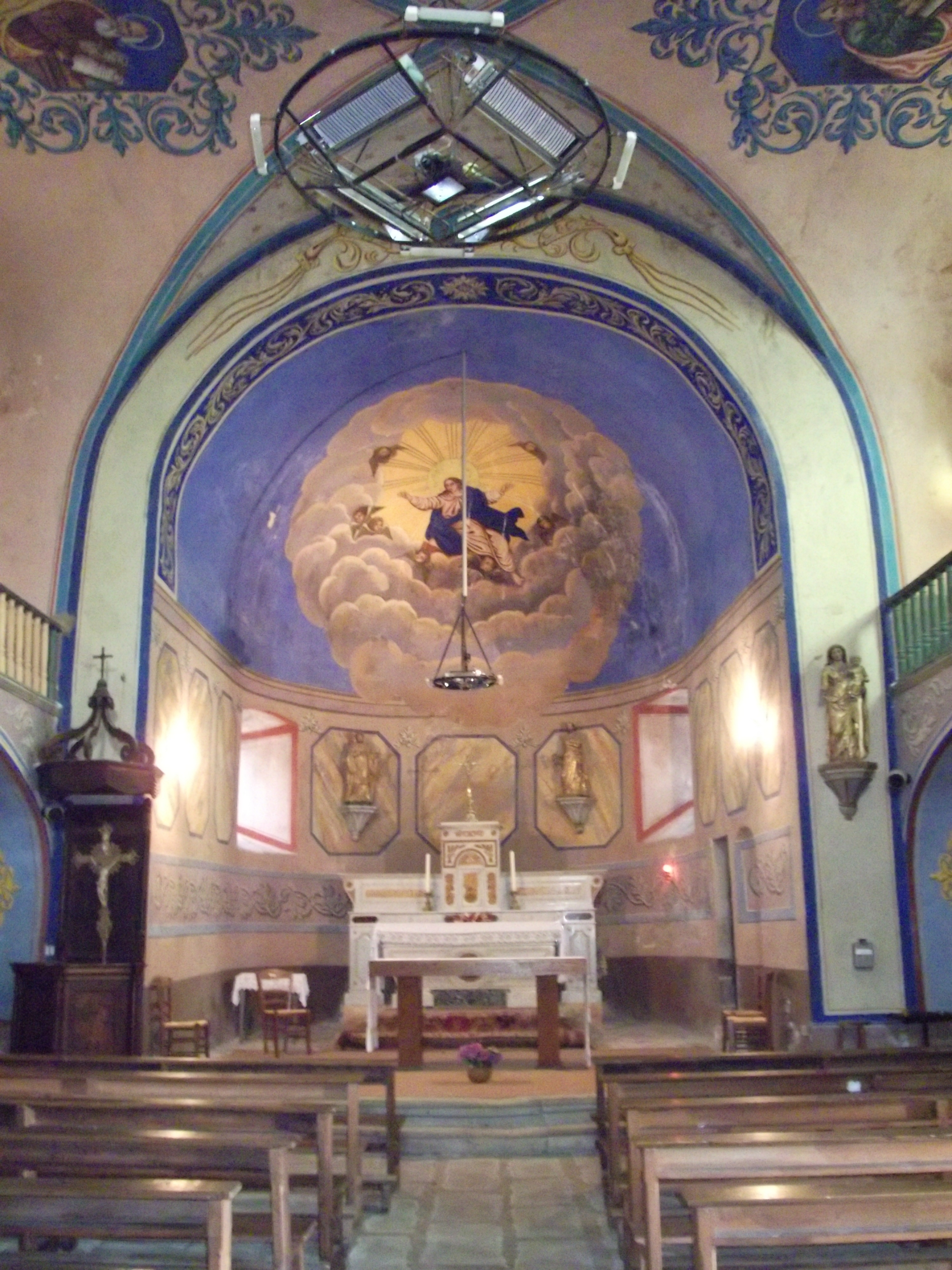
- The interior of the church in Saint-Andéol-de-Vals
- Location of Saint-Andéol-de-Vals
- Location within France Location within Auvergne-Rhône-Alpes
- Coordinates: 44°41′34″N 4°24′07″E
- Country: France
- Region: Auvergne-Rhône-Alpes
- Department: Ardèche
- Arrondissement: Largentière
- Canton: Aubenas-1

Government
  - Mayor (2020–2026): David Marijon
- Area^{1}: 16.65 km^{2} (6.43 sq mi)
- Elevation: 481 m (1,578 ft)
- Highest elevation: 786 m (2,579 ft)
- Lowest elevation: 304 m (997 ft)
- Population (2023): 535
  - Density: 32.1/km^{2} (83.2/sq mi)
- Time zone: UTC+01:00 (CET)
  - Summer (DST): UTC+02:00 (CEST)
- INSEE/Postal code: 07210 /07600
- ^{1} French Land Register data, which excludes lakes, ponds, glaciers > 1 km^{2} (0.386 sq mi or 247 acres) and river estuaries.

Saint-Andéol-de-Vals (Occitan: Sant Andiòu de Vals) is a commune in the Ardèche department in the Auvergne-Rhône-Alpes region in southern France.

== Population ==
Historical population
Year	Pop.	±% p.a.
1968	362	—
1975	345	−0.68%
1982	391	+1.80%
1990	413	+0.69%
1999	437	+0.63%
2007	538	+2.63%
2012	536	−0.07%
2017	526	−0.38%
2023	535	+0.28%
Source: INSEE

== See also ==
- Communes of the Ardèche department
