= Mézilhac =

- Commune
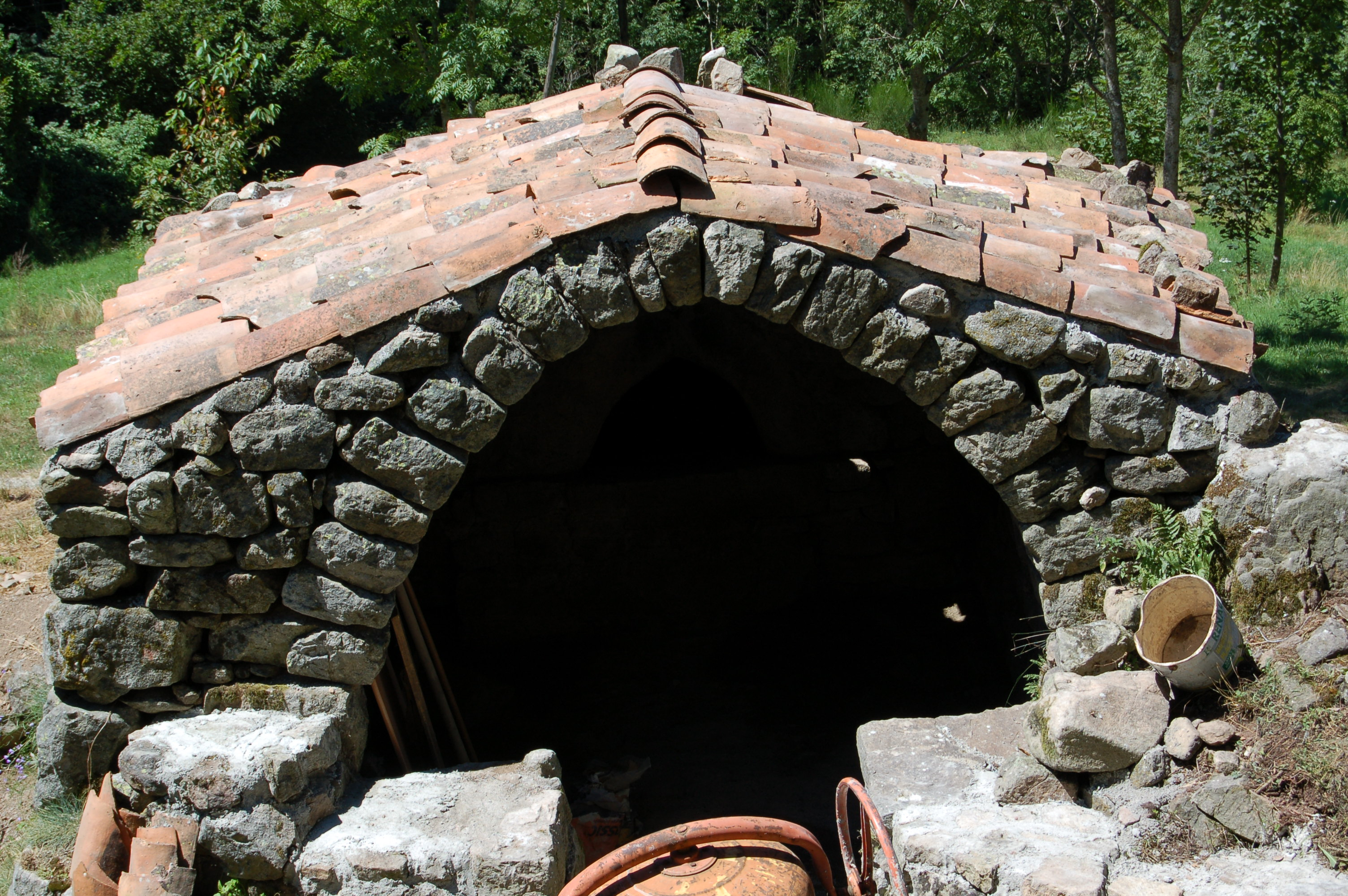
- Bread oven
- Location of Mézilhac
- Location within France Location within Auvergne-Rhône-Alpes
- Coordinates: 44°48′31″N 4°21′09″E
- Country: France
- Region: Auvergne-Rhône-Alpes
- Department: Ardèche
- Arrondissement: Largentière
- Canton: Aubenas-1

Government
  - Mayor (2020–2026): Baptiste Teyssier
- Area^{1}: 26.66 km^{2} (10.29 sq mi)
- Elevation: 1,140 m (3,740 ft)
- Highest elevation: 1,445 m (4,741 ft)
- Lowest elevation: 717 m (2,352 ft)
- Population (2023): 107
  - Density: 4.01/km^{2} (10.4/sq mi)
- Time zone: UTC+01:00 (CET)
  - Summer (DST): UTC+02:00 (CEST)
- INSEE/Postal code: 07158 /07530
- ^{1} French Land Register data, which excludes lakes, ponds, glaciers > 1 km^{2} (0.386 sq mi or 247 acres) and river estuaries.

Mézilhac (French pronunciation: [mezijak]; Occitan: Mesilhac) is a commune in the Ardèche department in the Auvergne-Rhône-Alpes region in southern France.

== Population ==
Historical population
Year	Pop.	±% p.a.
1968	268	—
1975	191	−4.72%
1982	166	−1.98%
1990	140	−2.11%
1999	108	−2.84%
2007	109	+0.12%
2012	100	−1.71%
2017	95	−1.02%
2023	107	+2.00%
Source: INSEE

== See also ==
- Communes of the Ardèche department
