= Canton of Aubenas-1 =

Coordinates: 44.62°N 4.39°E

- Canton
- Situation of the canton of Aubenas-1 in the department of Ardèche
- Country: France
- Region: Auvergne-Rhône-Alpes
- Department: Ardèche
- No. of communes: {{{nbcomm}}}
- Population (2023): 17,683
- INSEE code: 0703

The canton of Aubenas-1 is an administrative division of the Ardèche department, southern France. It was created at the French canton reorganisation which came into effect in March 2015. Its seat is in Aubenas.

It consists of the following communes:

1. Aizac
2. Aubenas (partly)
3. Genestelle
4. Juvinas
5. Labastide-sur-Bésorgues
6. Labégude
7. Lachamp-Raphaël
8. Laviolle
9. Mézilhac
10. Saint-Andéol-de-Vals
11. Saint-Joseph-des-Bancs
12. Saint-Julien-du-Serre
13. Ucel
14. Vallées-d'Antraigues-Asperjoc
15. Vals-les-Bains
