= Laviolle =

- Commune
- Location of Laviolle
- Location within France Location within Auvergne-Rhône-Alpes
- Coordinates: 44°45′49″N 4°20′24″E
- Country: France
- Region: Auvergne-Rhône-Alpes
- Department: Ardèche
- Arrondissement: Largentière
- Canton: Aubenas-1

Government
  - Mayor (2020–2026): René Moulin
- Area^{1}: 13.84 km^{2} (5.34 sq mi)
- Elevation: 700 m (2,300 ft)
- Highest elevation: 1,364 m (4,475 ft)
- Lowest elevation: 560 m (1,840 ft)
- Population (2023): 98
  - Density: 7.1/km^{2} (18/sq mi)
- Time zone: UTC+01:00 (CET)
  - Summer (DST): UTC+02:00 (CEST)
- INSEE/Postal code: 07139 /07530
- ^{1} French Land Register data, which excludes lakes, ponds, glaciers > 1 km^{2} (0.386 sq mi or 247 acres) and river estuaries.

Laviolle (French pronunciation: [lavjɔl]; Occitan: Laviòla) is a commune in the Ardèche department in southern France.

== Population ==
Historical population
Year	Pop.	±% p.a.
1968	176	—
1975	160	−1.35%
1982	148	−1.11%
1990	119	−2.69%
1999	130	+0.99%
2007	125	−0.49%
2012	120	−0.81%
2017	109	−1.90%
2023	98	−1.76%
Source: INSEE

== See also ==
- Communes of the Ardèche department
