= Labastide-sur-Bésorgues =

Labastide-sur-Bésorgues La Bastida de Besòrgas (Occitan)
- Commune
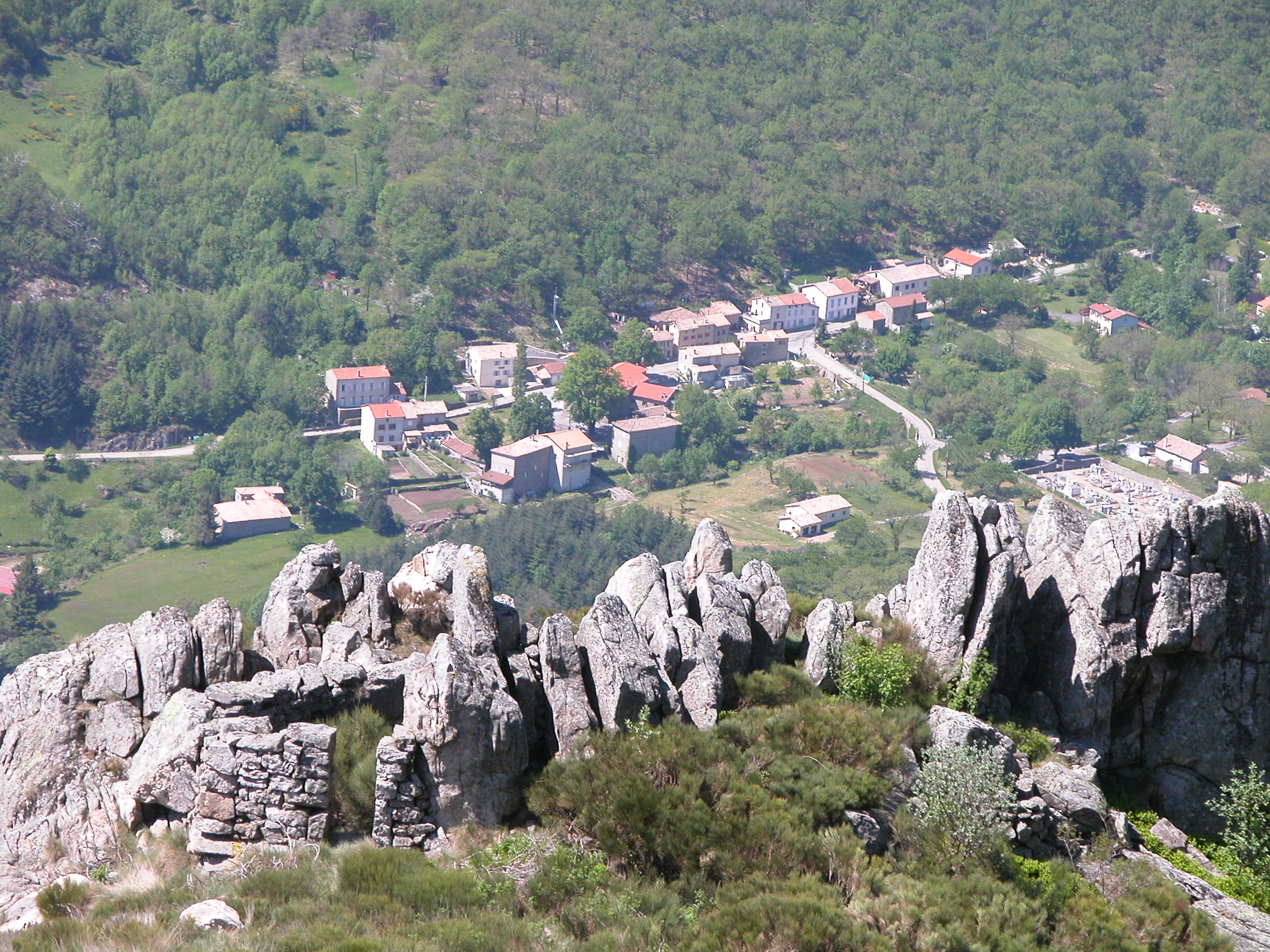
- A view of Labastide-sur-Bésorgues
- Location of Labastide-sur-Bésorgues
- Location within France Location within Auvergne-Rhône-Alpes
- Coordinates: 44°43′32″N 4°18′11″E
- Country: France
- Region: Auvergne-Rhône-Alpes
- Department: Ardèche
- Arrondissement: Largentière
- Canton: Aubenas-1

Government
  - Mayor (2023–2026): Serge Caviggia
- Area^{1}: 17.29 km^{2} (6.68 sq mi)
- Elevation: 650 m (2,130 ft)
- Highest elevation: 1,403 m (4,603 ft)
- Lowest elevation: 556 m (1,824 ft)
- Population (2023): 285
  - Density: 16.5/km^{2} (42.7/sq mi)
- Time zone: UTC+01:00 (CET)
  - Summer (DST): UTC+02:00 (CEST)
- INSEE/Postal code: 07112 /07600
- ^{1} French Land Register data, which excludes lakes, ponds, glaciers > 1 km^{2} (0.386 sq mi or 247 acres) and river estuaries.

Labastide-sur-Bésorgues (Occitan: La Bastida de Besòrgas, before 1993: Labastide-de-Juvinas) is a commune in the Ardèche department in the Auvergne-Rhône-Alpes region in Southern France.

== Demographics ==
Historical population
Year	Pop.	±% p.a.
1968	248	—
1975	189	−3.81%
1982	183	−0.46%
1990	192	+0.60%
1999	176	−0.96%
2007	220	+2.83%
2012	254	+2.92%
2017	258	+0.31%
2023	285	+1.67%
Source: INSEE

== See also ==
- Communes of the Ardèche department
