= Vals-les-Bains =

Vals-les-Bains Vals (Occitan)
- Commune
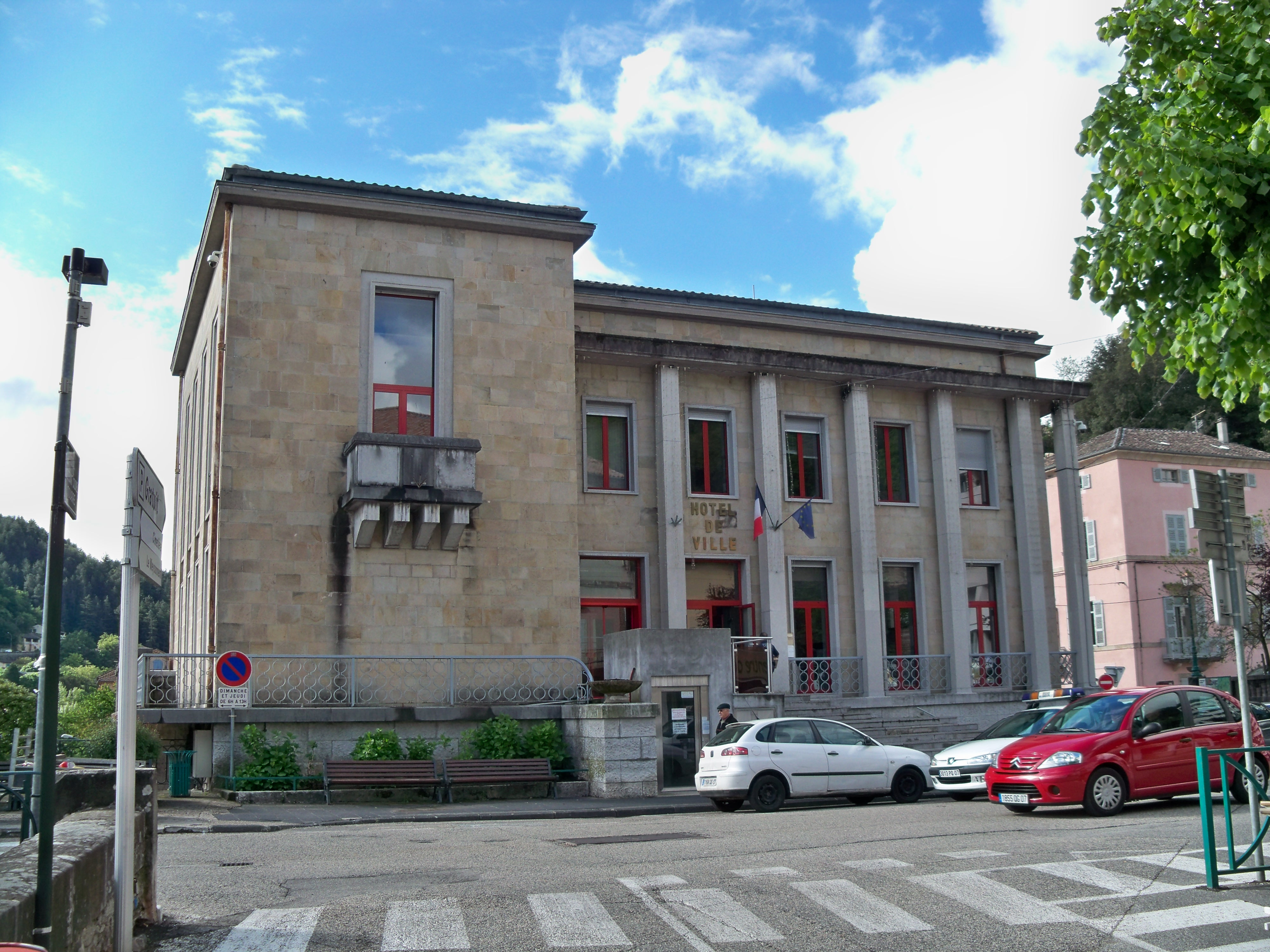
- The town hall in Vals-les-Bains

- Coat of arms
- Location of Vals-les-Bains
- Location within France Location within Auvergne-Rhône-Alpes
- Coordinates: 44°39′59″N 4°22′01″E
- Country: France
- Region: Auvergne-Rhône-Alpes
- Department: Ardèche
- Arrondissement: Largentière
- Canton: Aubenas-1
- Intercommunality: CC du Bassin d'Aubenas

Government
  - Mayor (2022–2026): Michel Ceysson
- Area^{1}: 19.2 km^{2} (7.4 sq mi)
- Elevation: 328 m (1,076 ft)
- Highest elevation: 985 m (3,232 ft)
- Lowest elevation: 250 m (820 ft)
- Population (2023): 3,474
  - Density: 181/km^{2} (469/sq mi)
- Demonym: Valsois
- Time zone: UTC+01:00 (CET)
  - Summer (DST): UTC+02:00 (CEST)
- INSEE/Postal code: 07331 /07600
- Website: www.vals-les-bains.fr
- ^{1} French Land Register data, which excludes lakes, ponds, glaciers > 1 km^{2} (0.386 sq mi or 247 acres) and river estuaries.

Vals-les-Bains (French pronunciation: [vals le bɛ̃]; lit. 'Vals-the-Baths'; Occitan: Vals) is a commune in the Ardèche department in southern France.

== Population ==
Historical population

Year	Pop.	±% p.a.
1793	2,063	—
1800	1,960	−0.73%
1806	2,090	+1.08%
1821	2,201	+0.35%
1831	2,355	+0.68%
1836	2,415	+0.50%
1841	2,789	+2.92%
1846	2,834	+0.32%
1851	2,875	+0.29%
1856	2,963	+0.60%
1861	2,800	−1.13%
1866	2,795	−0.04%
1872	3,240	+2.49%
1876	3,301	+0.47%
1881	3,410	+0.65%
1886	3,911	+2.78%
1891	3,684	−1.19%
1896	3,817	+0.71%
1901	4,025	+1.07%

Year	Pop.	±% p.a.
1906	4,352	+1.57%
1911	4,414	+0.28%
1921	4,004	−0.97%
1926	4,218	+1.05%
1931	3,956	−1.27%
1936	3,691	−1.38%
1946	3,719	+0.08%
1954	3,843	+0.41%
1962	3,866	+0.07%
1968	4,190	+1.35%
1975	4,129	−0.21%
1982	3,933	−0.69%
1990	3,661	−0.89%
1999	3,536	−0.39%
2007	3,741	+0.71%
2012	3,412	−1.82%
2017	3,582	+0.98%
2023	3,474	−0.51%

Source: EHESS and INSEE (1968–2023)

== See also ==
- Communes of the Ardèche department
