= Ailhon =

- Commune
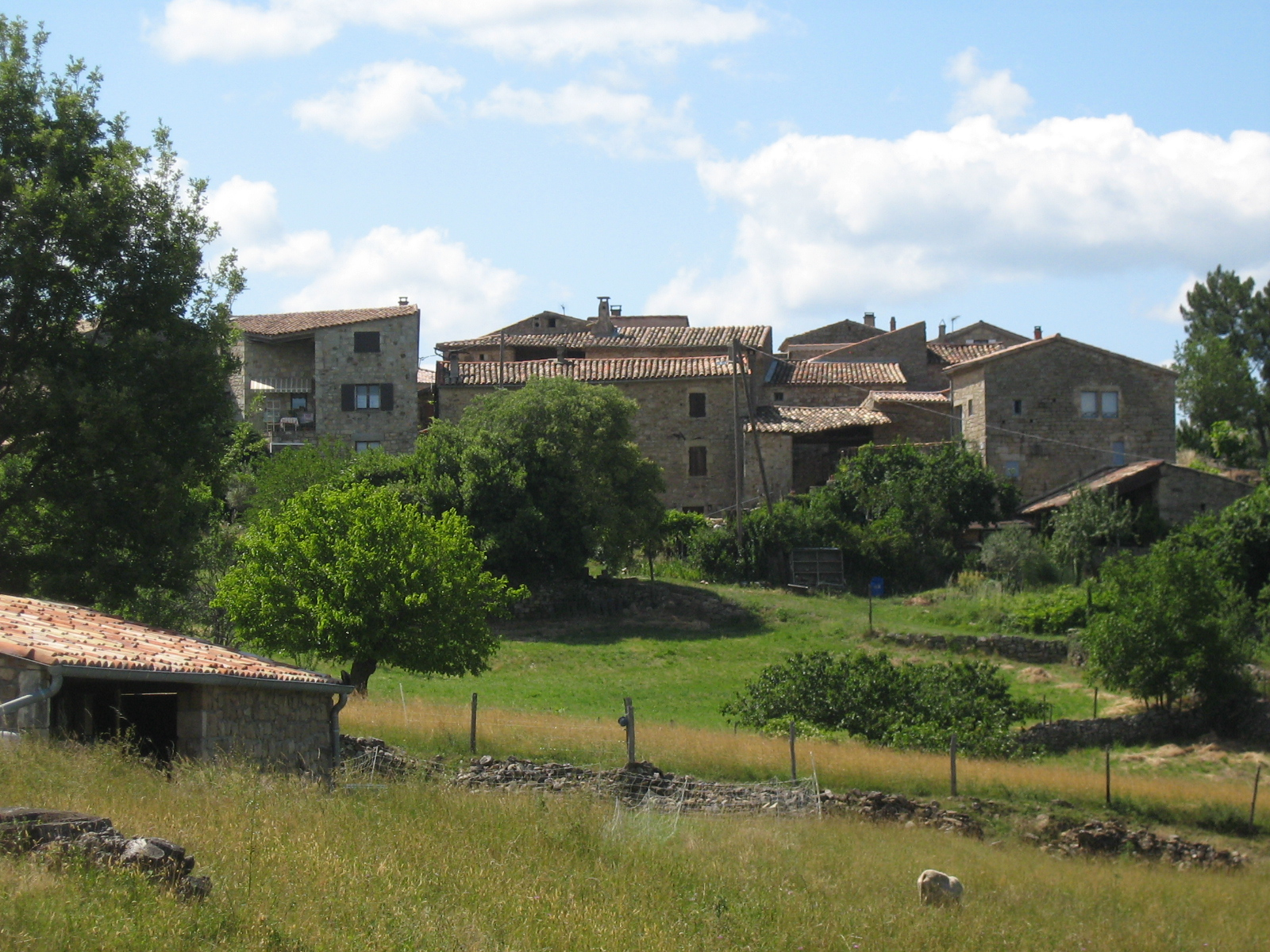
- Ailhon village
- Location of Ailhon
- Location within France Location within Auvergne-Rhône-Alpes
- Coordinates: 44°35′56″N 4°20′34″E
- Country: France
- Region: Auvergne-Rhône-Alpes
- Department: Ardèche
- Arrondissement: Largentière
- Canton: Aubenas-2
- Intercommunality: Bassin d'Aubenas

Government
  - Mayor (2020–2026): Jean-Paul Lardy
- Area^{1}: 7.8 km^{2} (3.0 sq mi)
- Elevation: 406 m (1,332 ft)
- Highest elevation: 544 m (1,785 ft)
- Lowest elevation: 258 m (846 ft)
- Population (2023): 553
  - Density: 71/km^{2} (180/sq mi)
- Time zone: UTC+01:00 (CET)
  - Summer (DST): UTC+02:00 (CEST)
- INSEE/Postal code: 07002 /07200
- ^{1} French Land Register data, which excludes lakes, ponds, glaciers > 1 km^{2} (0.386 sq mi or 247 acres) and river estuaries.

Ailhon (French pronunciation: [ajɔ̃]) is a commune in the Ardèche department in the Auvergne-Rhône-Alpes region of southern France.

== Geography ==
=== Location ===
Located at an altitude of 406 metres, Ailhon is a commune in the canton of Aubenas-2 and the arrondissement of Largentière, some 5 km south-west of Aubenas. It can be accessed by the D223 road from Prades in the north, a tortuous mountain road which continues south through the commune, without passing near the village, to join the D103. Access to the village is by the D235 from Aubenas in the north-east to the hamlet of La Charberterie in the north of the commune then the D359 south to the village continuing south to Merzelet. The commune is characterised by a large area with mountainous terrain heavily forested with a network of small mountain roads and many scattered hamlets.

Numerous streams cover the commune with the Ruisseau du Gary rising in the north and flowing the length of the commune gathering many tributaries south-west to join La Lanche which forms the south-western border of the commune. There is also the Auzon which rises just north of the commune and forms the eastern border gathering many tributaries and continues south to join the Ardeche near Saint-Sernin. The Ruisseau d'Ailhon flows through the village east to join the Auzon.

== History ==
A prehistoric tomb at Gay and many vestiges at Daus attest to human presence since antiquity.

It was in 1298 when the name of the noble family of Ailhon (Ailhou in patois and Alho in Latin) appeared for the first time when Pierre d'Ailhon sold a nearby fortified house to the house of Mirabel.

During the Wars of Religion, particularly from 1586 to 1591, the village paid a heavy price: the fort was taken and retaken and nothing remains except a tower in the Chabert house south of the village.

In 1670, Ailhon participated in the Roure Revolt, a rebellion caused by a disastrous harvest followed by a rumour of an increase in taxes. The insurgents armed only with scythes and sticks were massacred by the king's armies on the plain of Lavilledieu. The leader of the revolt, Anthoine du Roure, was arrested in Saint-Jean-Pied-de-Port and broken on the wheel in Montpellier on 29 October 1670. His body was then exposed on the high road from Montpellier to Nimes and his head placed on top of the Porte Saint-Antoine in Aubenas. A square Jacques Roure was dedicated to his memory in Aubenas (on the proposal of Councillor Durand in 1896). Another square (Anthoine du Roure) also bears his name in Lachapelle-sous-Aubenas.

The disorder during the French Revolution resulted in a band of brigands led by Fourniquet de Chassiers (executed at Saint-Cirgues-de-Prades in May 1800) scouring the territory.

== Administration ==
=== List of Successive Mayors of Ailhon ===
Mayors from the French Revolution to 1904

From	To	Name	Party	Position
1793	1794	Antoine Gourdon		Public Officer
1794	1798	François Fulachier		Public Officer
1798	1808	Antoine Chabert		Mayor
1808	1815	Jean Roudil		Mayor
1815	1825	Claude Darlix		Mayor
1825	1830	Jean-Pierre Jaussen		Mayor
1830	1832	Unknown		Mayor
1832	1834	François Veyrent		Mayor
1834	1848	Jacques Jaussen		Mayor
1848	1864	Louis Plantevin		Mayor
1864	1870	André Daygues		Mayor
1870	1873	Louis Jaussen		Mayor
1873	1875	Prosper Roure		Mayor
1876	1881	Henri Veyrant		Mayor
1881	1890	Gaston Ricard		Mayor
1890	1892	Cyprien Arlaud		Mayor
1892	1896	Pierre Guibourdenche		Mayor
1896	1900	Auguste Roudil		Mayor
1900	1904	Xavier Fulachier		Mayor
1904		Victorin Reynaud		Mayor

Mayors from 1977

From	To	Name	Party	Position
1977	2001	Roger Naud		
2001	2008	Michel Gilbert		
2008	Current	Jean Paul Lardy	PS	

== Population ==
The inhabitants of the commune are known as Ailhonnais or Ailhonnaises in French.

Historical population
Year	Pop.	±% p.a.
1968	140	—
1975	134	−0.62%
1982	173	+3.72%
1990	290	+6.67%
1999	336	+1.65%
2007	462	+4.06%
2012	535	+2.98%
2017	554	+0.70%
2023	553	−0.03%
Source: INSEE

== Sites and Monuments ==
- Daus (a Celtic tumulus): prehistoric site
- The Church of Saint André (13th century) is registered as an historical monument. The church was enlarged and revised until the beginning of the 16th century and it houses many sculptures. There is a huge trunk of an Elm tree planted in 1593 - as in many parishes - by order of Maximilien de Béthune, Duke of Sully, to celebrate the conversion to the Catholic religion of Henry IV. Two items in the church are registered as historical objects:
  - A Sarcophagus cover (15th century)
  - A Stoup (18th century)

=== Picture Gallery ===
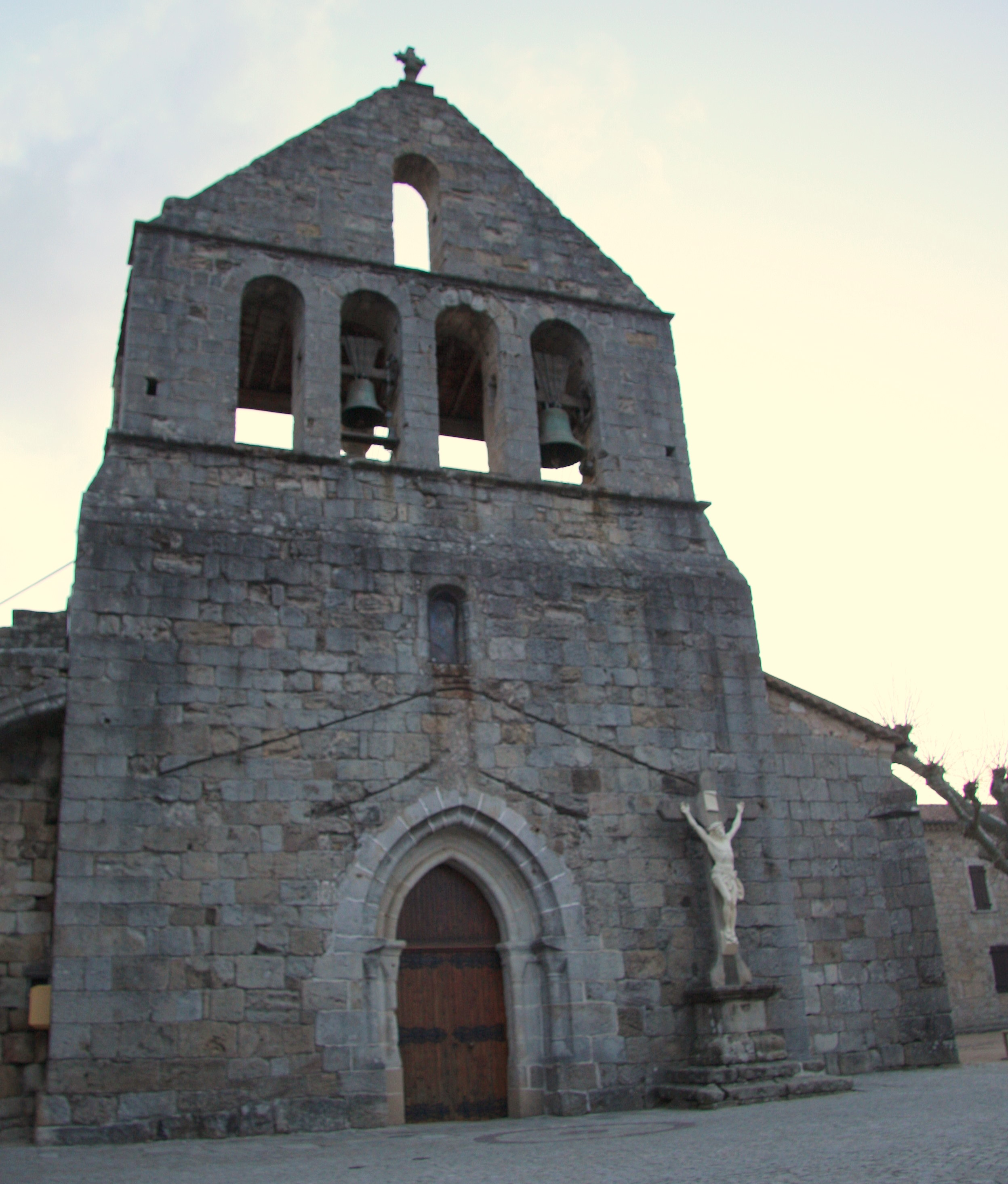
Front of the Romanesque church

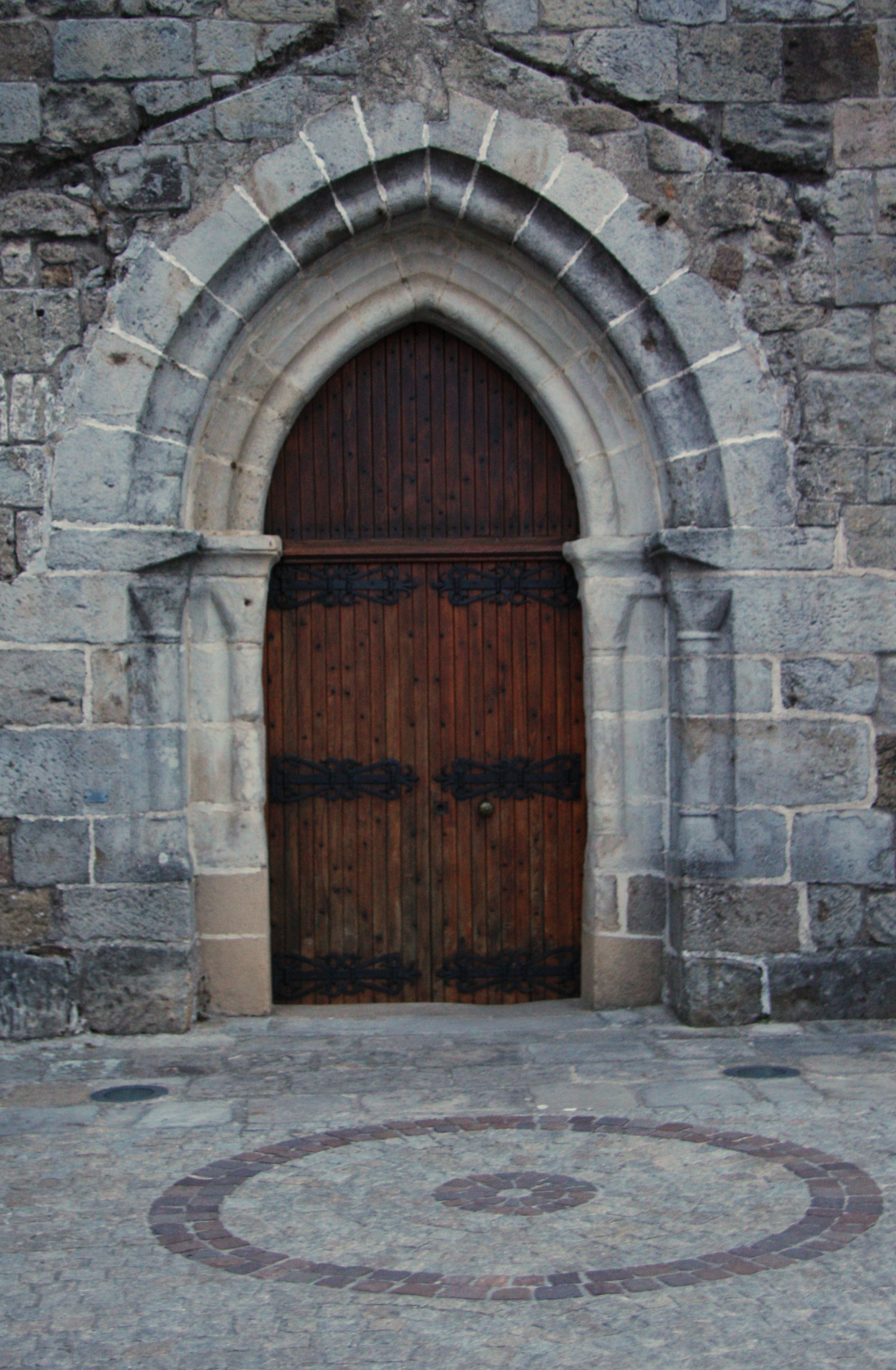
Church Porch

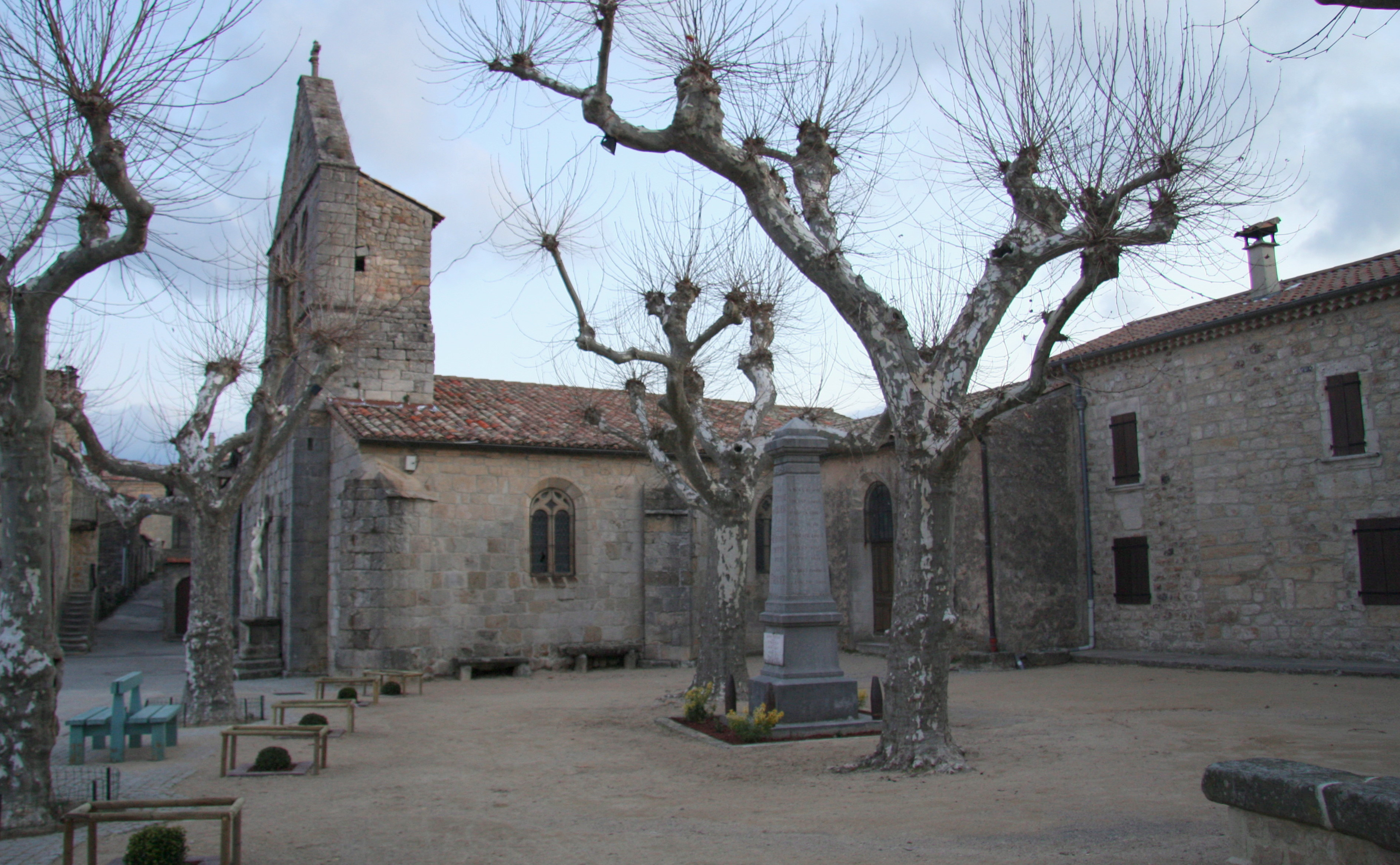
Village Square

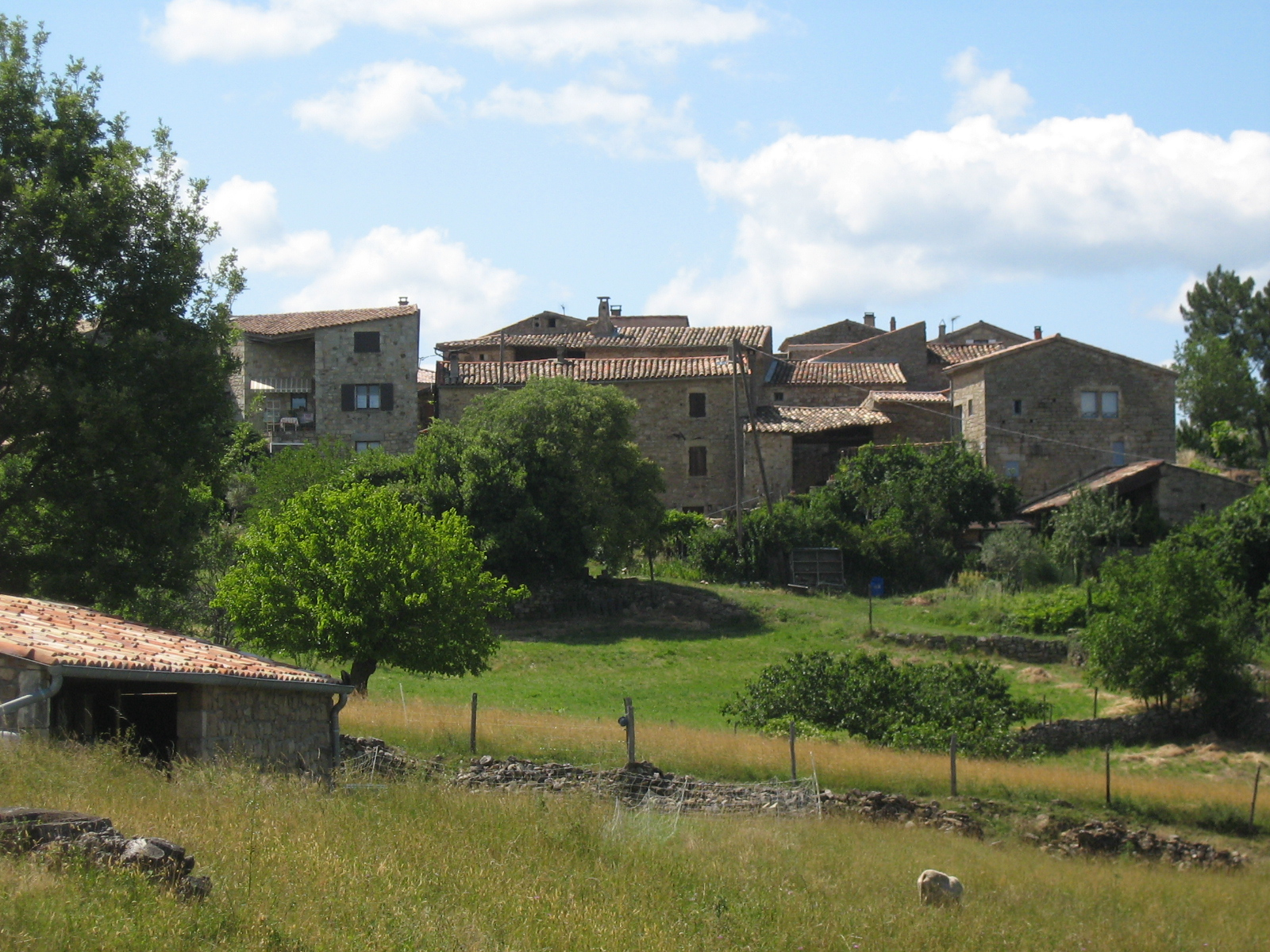
View of the village

=== Panoramic views ===
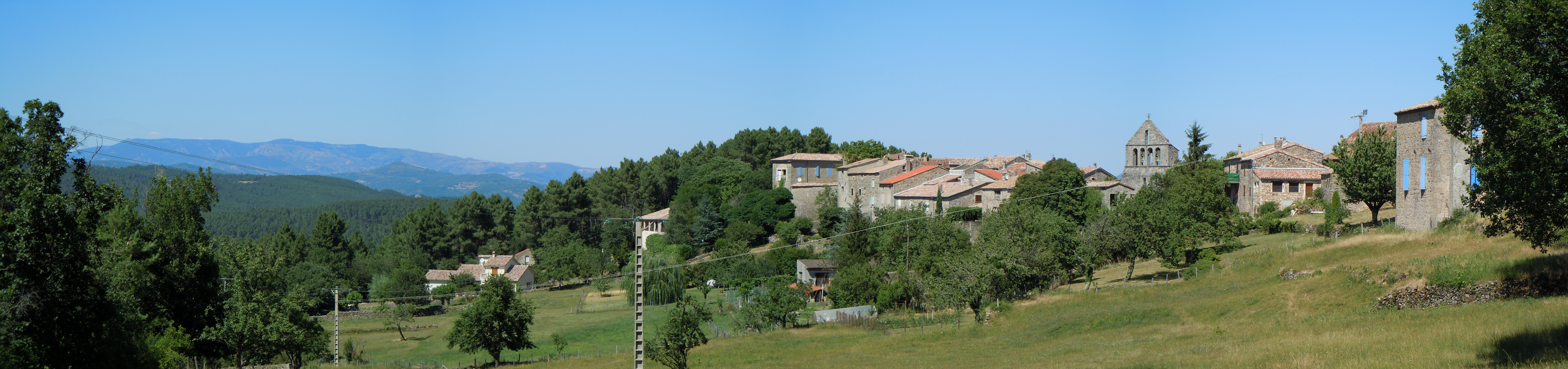
General View of Ailhon from the south.

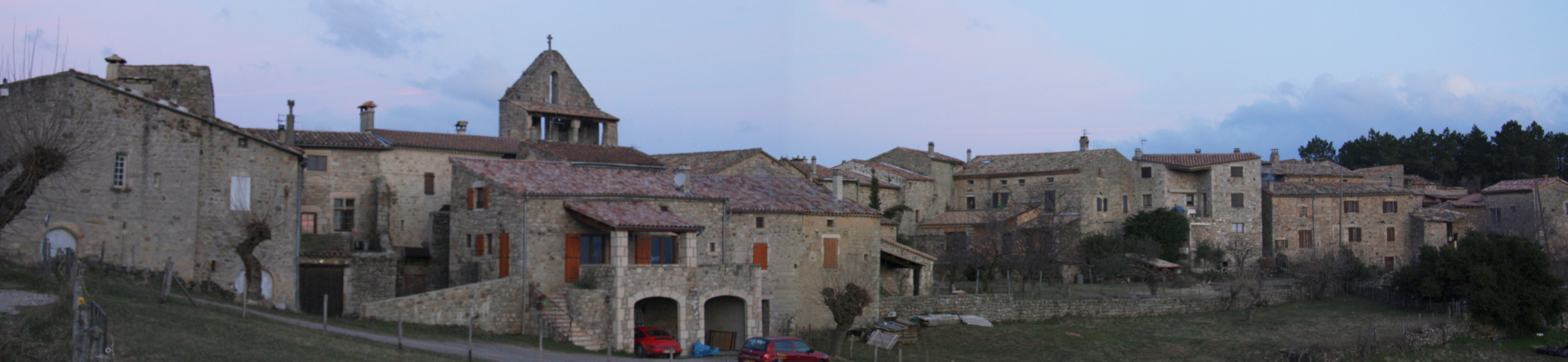
General view of Ailhon from the north.

== See also ==
- Communes of the Ardèche department
- Cantons of the Ardèche department
- Arrondissements of the Ardèche department

=== Bibliography ===
- Charles Albin Mazon (1828-1908), A Historical Account of the Ancient Parish of Ailhon, Privas, imprimerie centrale, 1905 (in French)
