= Fons =

Fons may refer to:

== Places ==
- Fons, Ardèche, France
- Fons, Gard, France
- Fons, Lot, France

== Other uses ==
- Fons memorabilium universi, a Renaissance encyclopedia
- Fontus, an ancient Roman water deity
- Leonard Fons (1903–1956), American politician
- Jorge Fons Pérez (1939-2022), Mexican film director
- A Dutch masculine given name, see Alphons

== See also ==
- Fon (disambiguation)
