= Château de Boulogne =

Castle ruin in France

- Saint-Michel-de-Boulogne in France
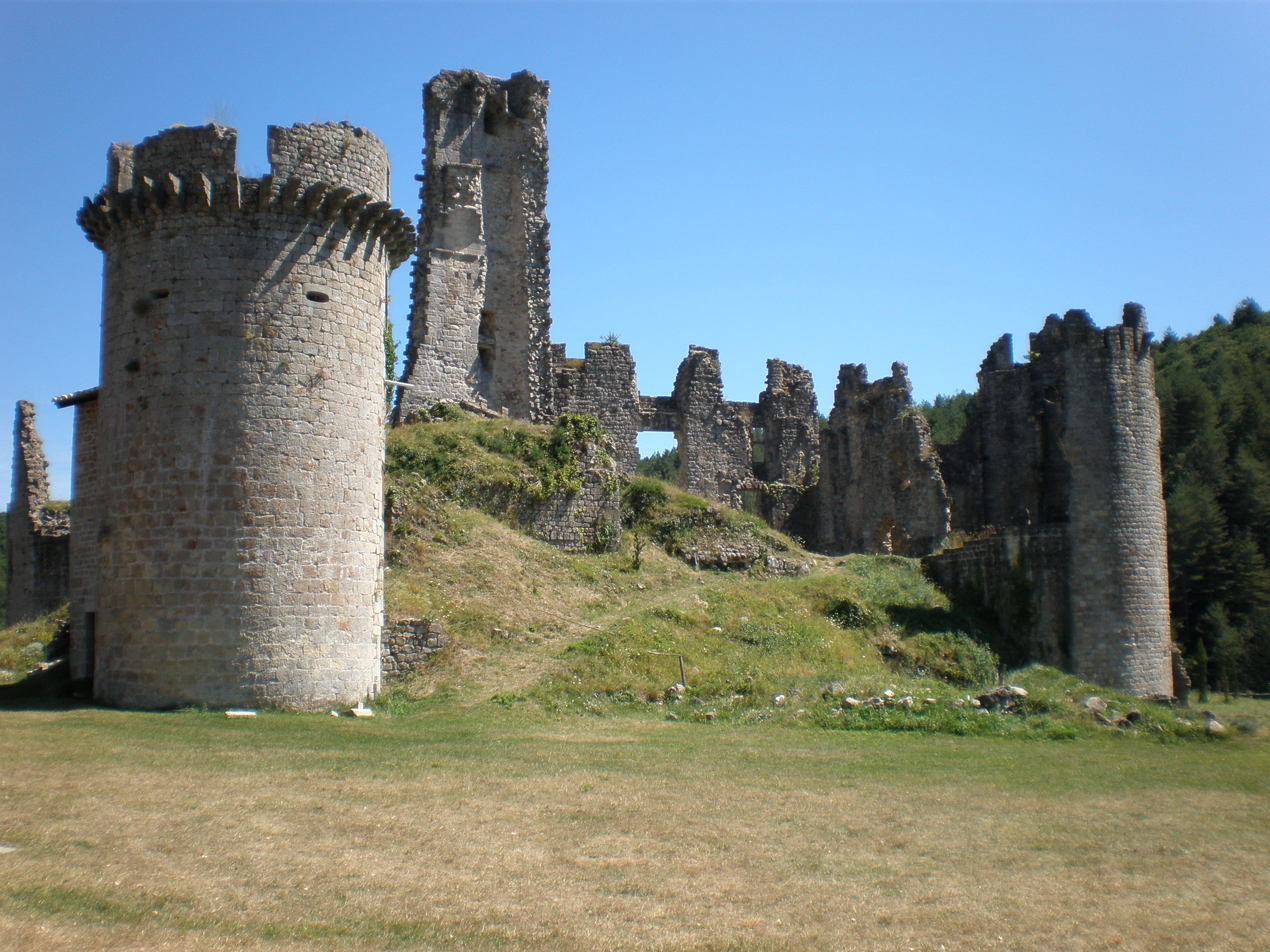
- Château de Boulogne

Site information
- Type: Castle
- Owner: Privately owned
- Condition: Preserved ruin

Location
- Coordinates: 44°41′24″N 4°26′23″E

Site history
- Built: 11th, 14th, 16th centuries

The Château de Boulogne is a well-preserved castle ruin situated in the commune of Saint-Michel-de-Boulogne in the Ardèche département of France.

== History ==
The history of the castle is intimately linked to that of the Lestrange family (Raoul de L'Estrange having acquired it in 1384 from the Count of Poitiers-Valentinois, Louis II), close to the royal court from the 14th century, and the marriage of Baron de l'Estrange (Claude de Hautefort, son of René de Hautefort and Marie de L'Estrange, Catholic) and Paule de Chambaud Baroness de Privas (Protestant, widow of René de La Tour-du-Pin-Gouvernet) was at the origin of an episode of the French Wars of Religion, and ended with the Siege of Privas (1629) by the troops of Louis XIII.

The castle was dismantled at the end of the Wars of Religion

At the time of the French Revolution, it was declared a national asset and sold.

This building was ransacked by demolishers in 1820.

== Architecture ==
The castle stands on a rocky escarpment bordered by two small streams. To the east, it is protected by a moat.

In the 11th century, only a square keep and a chapel existed. It was only in the 14th century that three large round towers and curtain walls were added to strengthen the fortress. The castle was transformed into a Renaissance residence in the 16th century, around 1550. The Guard Room, stables, the large terrace of the entrance, the châtelet and its Renaissance portal, with a sculpture of the head of Marie de Langeac, date from the period. The castle is in ruins, but is regularly repaired.

== Historic monument ==
The castle ruins were classified as a monument historique by the French Ministry of Culture in 1915.

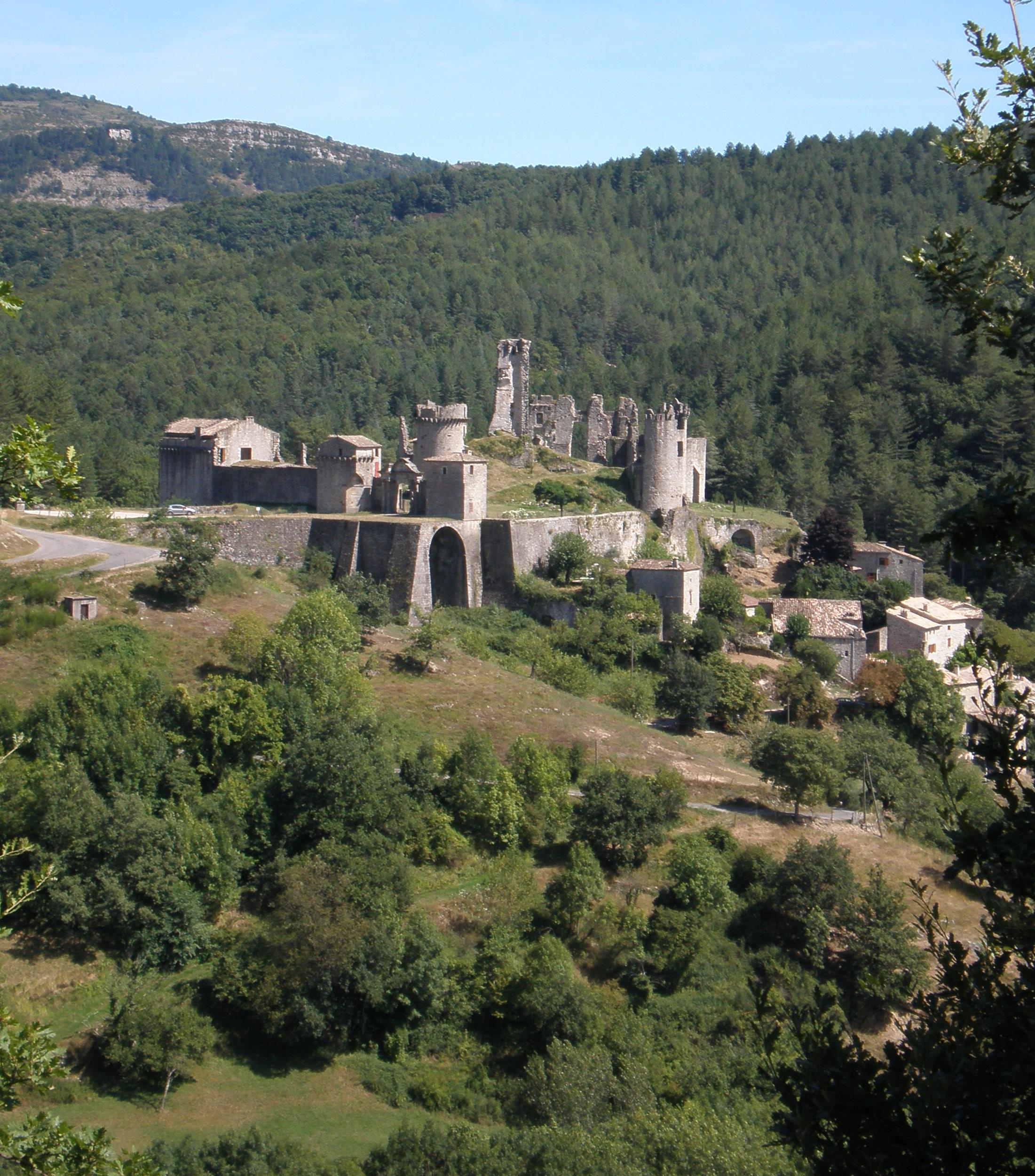
Chateau de Boulogne

== See also ==
- List of castles in France
