= Mercuer =

- Commune
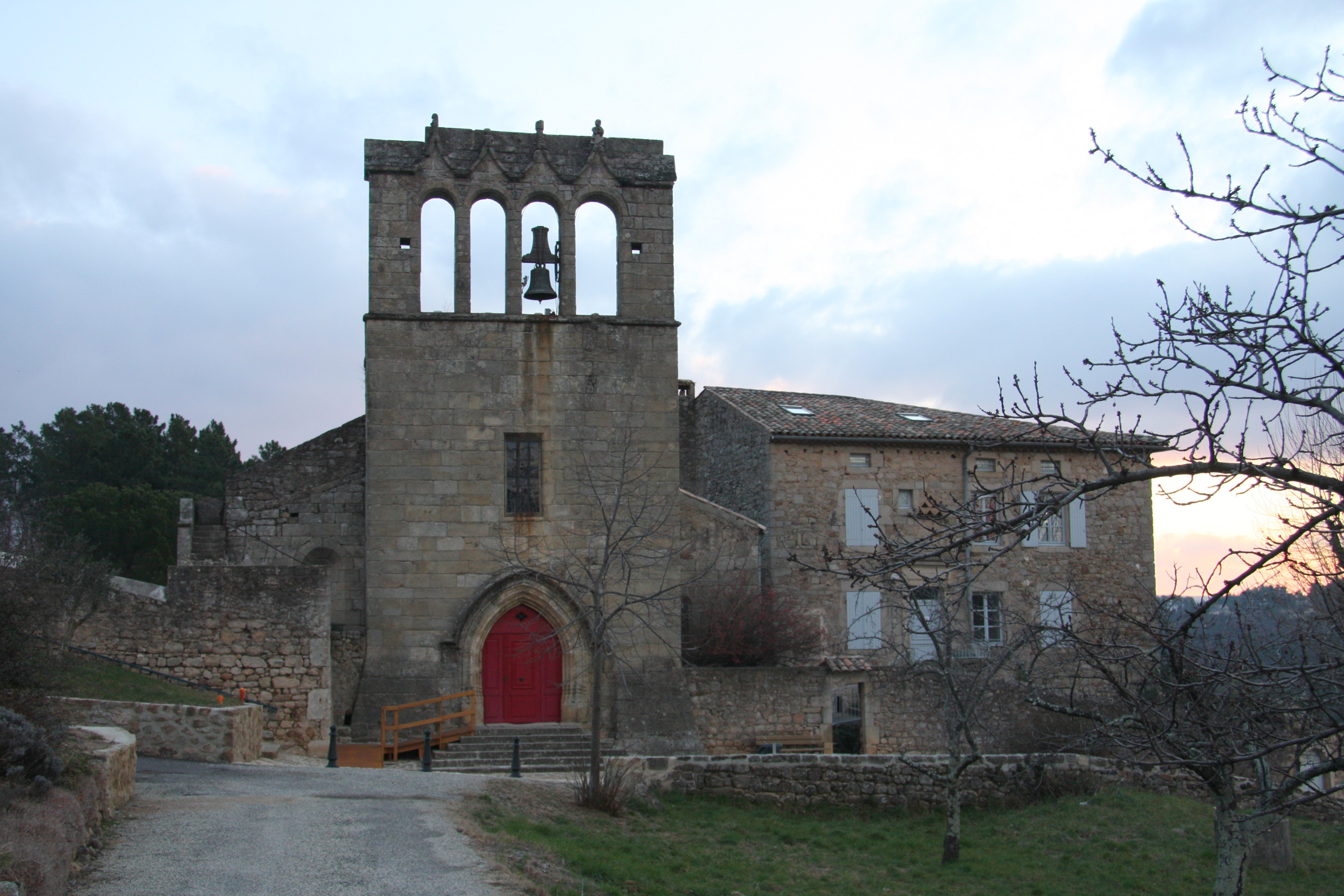
- The church in Mercuer
- Location of Mercuer
- Location within France Location within Auvergne-Rhône-Alpes
- Coordinates: 44°37′55″N 4°21′31″E
- Country: France
- Region: Auvergne-Rhône-Alpes
- Department: Ardèche
- Arrondissement: Largentière
- Canton: Aubenas-2

Government
  - Mayor (2020–2026): Didier Beral
- Area^{1}: 7.57 km^{2} (2.92 sq mi)
- Elevation: 380 m (1,250 ft)
- Highest elevation: 535 m (1,755 ft)
- Lowest elevation: 257 m (843 ft)
- Population (2023): 1,325
  - Density: 175/km^{2} (453/sq mi)
- Time zone: UTC+01:00 (CET)
  - Summer (DST): UTC+02:00 (CEST)
- INSEE/Postal code: 07155 /07200
- ^{1} French Land Register data, which excludes lakes, ponds, glaciers > 1 km^{2} (0.386 sq mi or 247 acres) and river estuaries.

Mercuer (French pronunciation: [mɛʁkɥe]; Occitan: Mercuri) is a commune in the Ardèche department in southern France.

== Population ==
Historical population
Year	Pop.	±% p.a.
1968	432	—
1975	564	+3.88%
1982	695	+3.03%
1990	938	+3.82%
1999	1,010	+0.83%
2007	1,167	+1.82%
2012	1,163	−0.07%
2017	1,210	+0.80%
2023	1,325	+1.52%
Source: INSEE

== See also ==
- Communes of the Ardèche department
