= Saint-Privat, Ardèche =

Saint-Privat
- Commune
- Location of Saint-Privat
- Location within France Location within Auvergne-Rhône-Alpes
- Coordinates: 44°37′46″N 4°24′55″E
- Country: France
- Region: Auvergne-Rhône-Alpes
- Department: Ardèche
- Arrondissement: Largentière
- Canton: Aubenas-2

Government
  - Mayor (2020–2026): Serge Reynier
- Area^{1}: 6.13 km^{2} (2.37 sq mi)
- Elevation: 204 m (669 ft)
- Highest elevation: 409 m (1,342 ft)
- Lowest elevation: 177 m (581 ft)
- Population (2023): 1,663
  - Density: 271/km^{2} (703/sq mi)
- Time zone: UTC+01:00 (CET)
  - Summer (DST): UTC+02:00 (CEST)
- INSEE/Postal code: 07289 /07200
- ^{1} French Land Register data, which excludes lakes, ponds, glaciers > 1 km^{2} (0.386 sq mi or 247 acres) and river estuaries.

Saint-Privat (French pronunciation: [sɛ̃ pʁiva]; Occitan: Sant Privat) is a commune in the Ardèche department in southern France.

== Population ==
Historical population
Year	Pop.	±% p.a.
1968	922	—
1975	1,018	+1.43%
1982	1,129	+1.49%
1990	1,359	+2.34%
1999	1,427	+0.54%
2007	1,570	+1.20%
2012	1,615	+0.57%
2017	1,735	+1.44%
2023	1,663	−0.70%
Source: INSEE

== See also ==
- Communes of the Ardèche department
