= Saint-Didier-sous-Aubenas =

- Commune
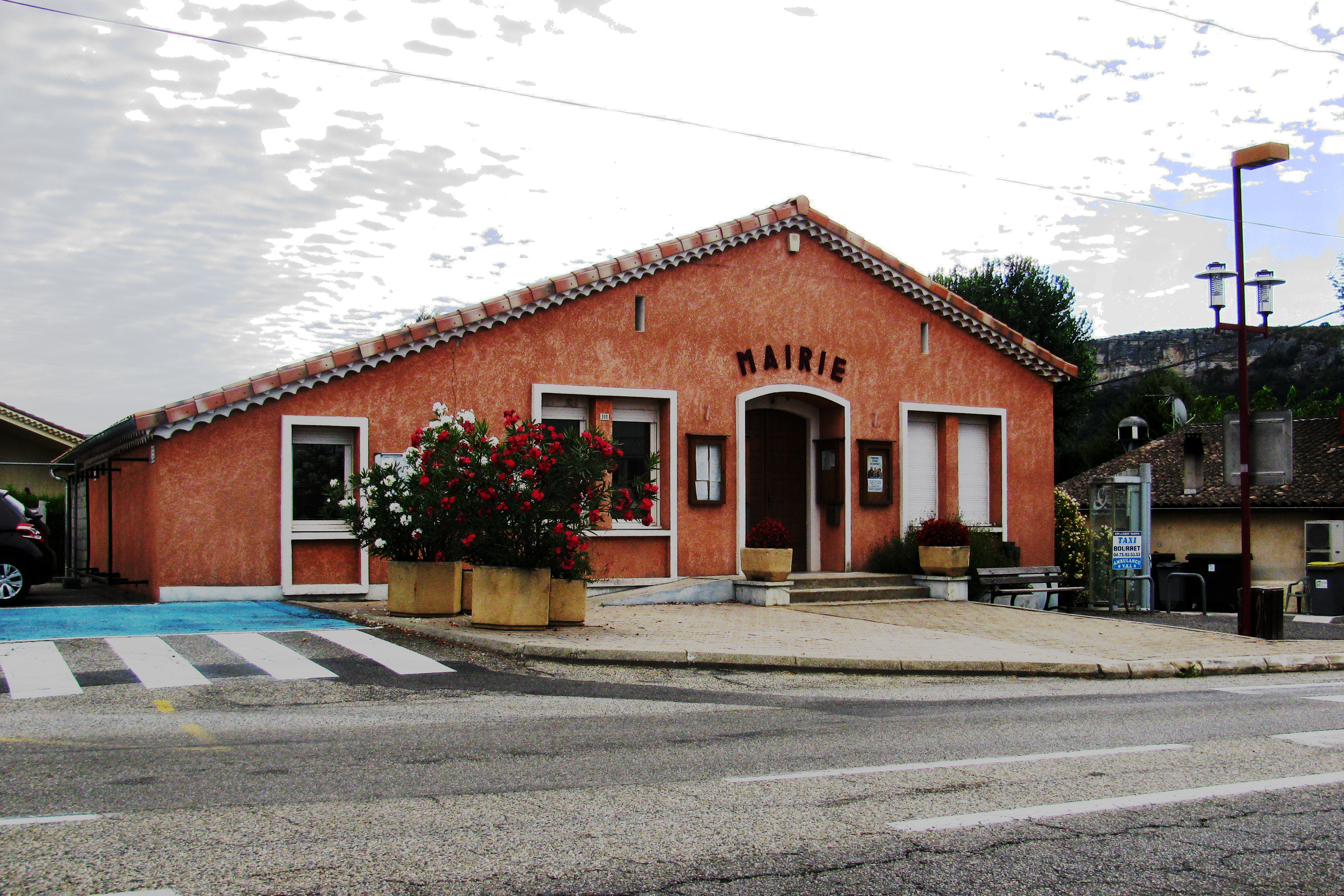
- Town hall

- Coat of arms
- Location of Saint-Didier-sous-Aubenas
- Location within France Location within Auvergne-Rhône-Alpes
- Coordinates: 44°36′28″N 4°24′57″E
- Country: France
- Region: Auvergne-Rhône-Alpes
- Department: Ardèche
- Arrondissement: Largentière
- Canton: Aubenas-2

Government
  - Mayor (2020–2026): Richard Massebeuf
- Area^{1}: 2.76 km^{2} (1.07 sq mi)
- Elevation: 190 m (620 ft)
- Highest elevation: 324 m (1,063 ft)
- Lowest elevation: 175 m (574 ft)
- Population (2023): 919
  - Density: 333/km^{2} (862/sq mi)
- Time zone: UTC+01:00 (CET)
  - Summer (DST): UTC+02:00 (CEST)
- INSEE/Postal code: 07229 /07200
- ^{1} French Land Register data, which excludes lakes, ponds, glaciers > 1 km^{2} (0.386 sq mi or 247 acres) and river estuaries.

Saint-Didier-sous-Aubenas (French pronunciation: [sɛ̃ didje su.z‿obna], literally Saint-Didier under Aubenas; Occitan: Sant Desideri sota Aubenàs) is a commune in the Ardèche department in southern France.

== Population ==
Historical population
| Year | Pop. | ±% p.a. |
|---|---|---|
| 1968 | 425 | — |
| 1975 | 783 | +9.12% |
| 1982 | 840 | +1.01% |
| 1990 | 751 | −1.39% |
| 1999 | 731 | −0.30% |
| 2007 | 748 | +0.29% |
| 2012 | 861 | +2.85% |
| 2017 | 961 | +2.22% |
| 2023 | 919 | −0.74% |
Source: INSEE

== See also ==
- Communes of the Ardèche department
