= Canton of Aubenas-2 =

Coordinates: 44.61°N 4.40°E

- Canton
- Situation of the canton of Aubenas-2 in the department of Ardèche
- Country: France
- Region: Auvergne-Rhône-Alpes
- Department: Ardèche
- No. of communes: {{{nbcomm}}}
- Population (2023): 21,403
- INSEE code: 0704

The canton of Aubenas-2 is an administrative division of the Ardèche department, southern France. It was created at the French canton reorganisation which came into effect in March 2015. Its seat is in Aubenas.

It consists of the following communes:

1. Ailhon
2. Aubenas (partly)
3. Fons
4. Lachapelle-sous-Aubenas
5. Lanas
6. Lentillères
7. Mercuer
8. Saint-Didier-sous-Aubenas
9. Saint-Étienne-de-Boulogne
10. Saint-Étienne-de-Fontbellon
11. Saint-Michel-de-Boulogne
12. Saint-Privat
13. Saint-Sernin
14. Vesseaux
15. Vinezac
