= Vesseaux =

- Commune
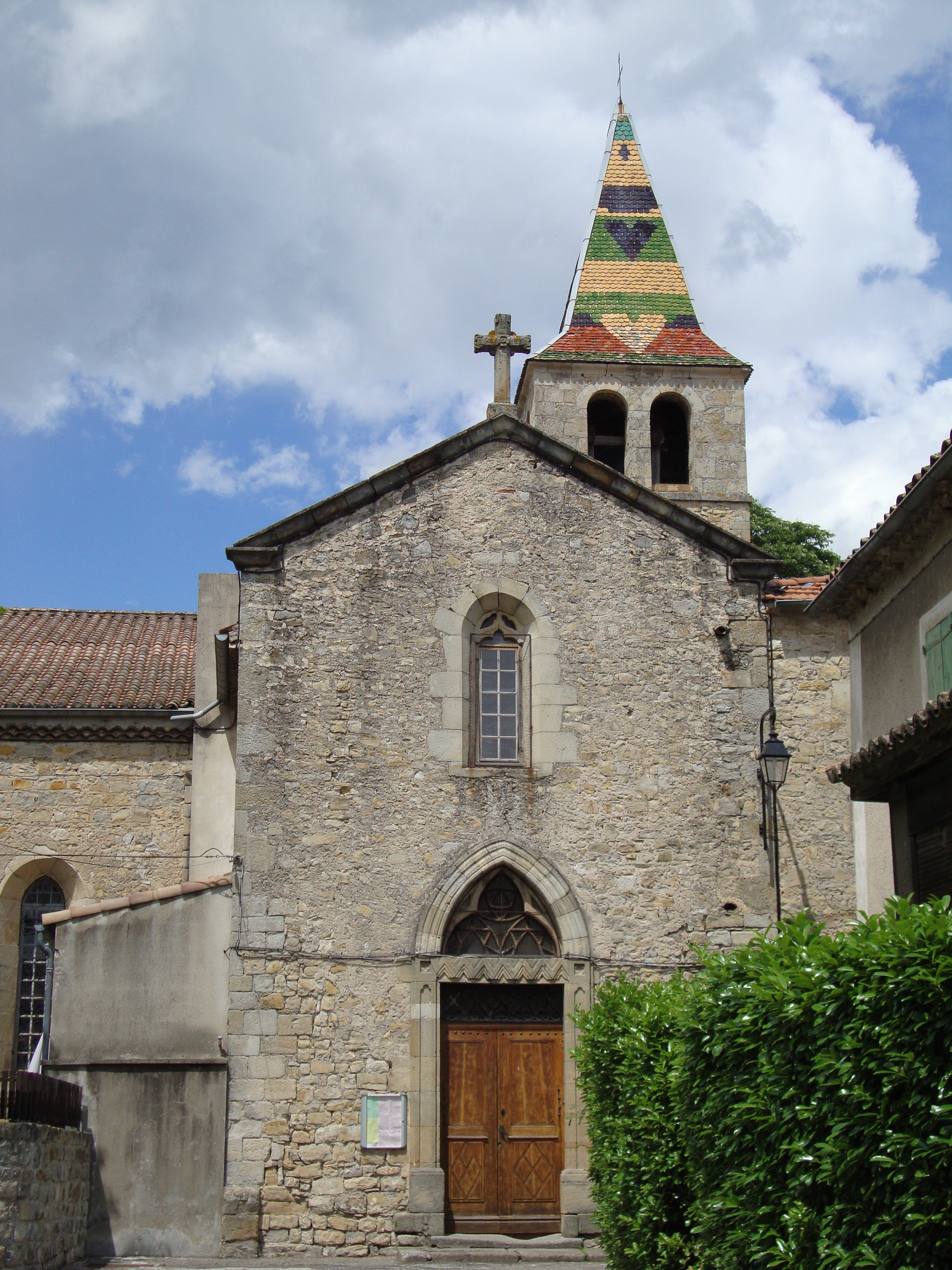
- The church in Vesseaux
- Location of Vesseaux
- Location within France Location within Auvergne-Rhône-Alpes
- Coordinates: 44°39′09″N 4°26′28″E
- Country: France
- Region: Auvergne-Rhône-Alpes
- Department: Ardèche
- Arrondissement: Largentière
- Canton: Aubenas-2
- Intercommunality: Bassin d'Aubenas

Government
  - Mayor (2020–2026): Max Tourvieilhe
- Area^{1}: 18.71 km^{2} (7.22 sq mi)
- Elevation: 280 m (920 ft)
- Highest elevation: 702 m (2,303 ft)
- Lowest elevation: 219 m (719 ft)
- Population (2023): 2,069
  - Density: 110.6/km^{2} (286.4/sq mi)
- Time zone: UTC+01:00 (CET)
  - Summer (DST): UTC+02:00 (CEST)
- INSEE/Postal code: 07339 /07200
- ^{1} French Land Register data, which excludes lakes, ponds, glaciers > 1 km^{2} (0.386 sq mi or 247 acres) and river estuaries.

Vesseaux (French pronunciation: [vɛso]; Occitan: Vessau) is a commune in the Ardèche department in southern France.

== Population ==
Historical population
Year	Pop.	±% p.a.
1968	734	—
1975	762	+0.54%
1982	839	+1.38%
1990	1,065	+3.03%
1999	1,276	+2.03%
2007	1,543	+2.40%
2012	1,746	+2.50%
2017	1,928	+2.00%
2023	2,069	+1.18%
Source: INSEE

== See also ==
- Communes of the Ardèche department
