= Lavilledieu =

- Commune
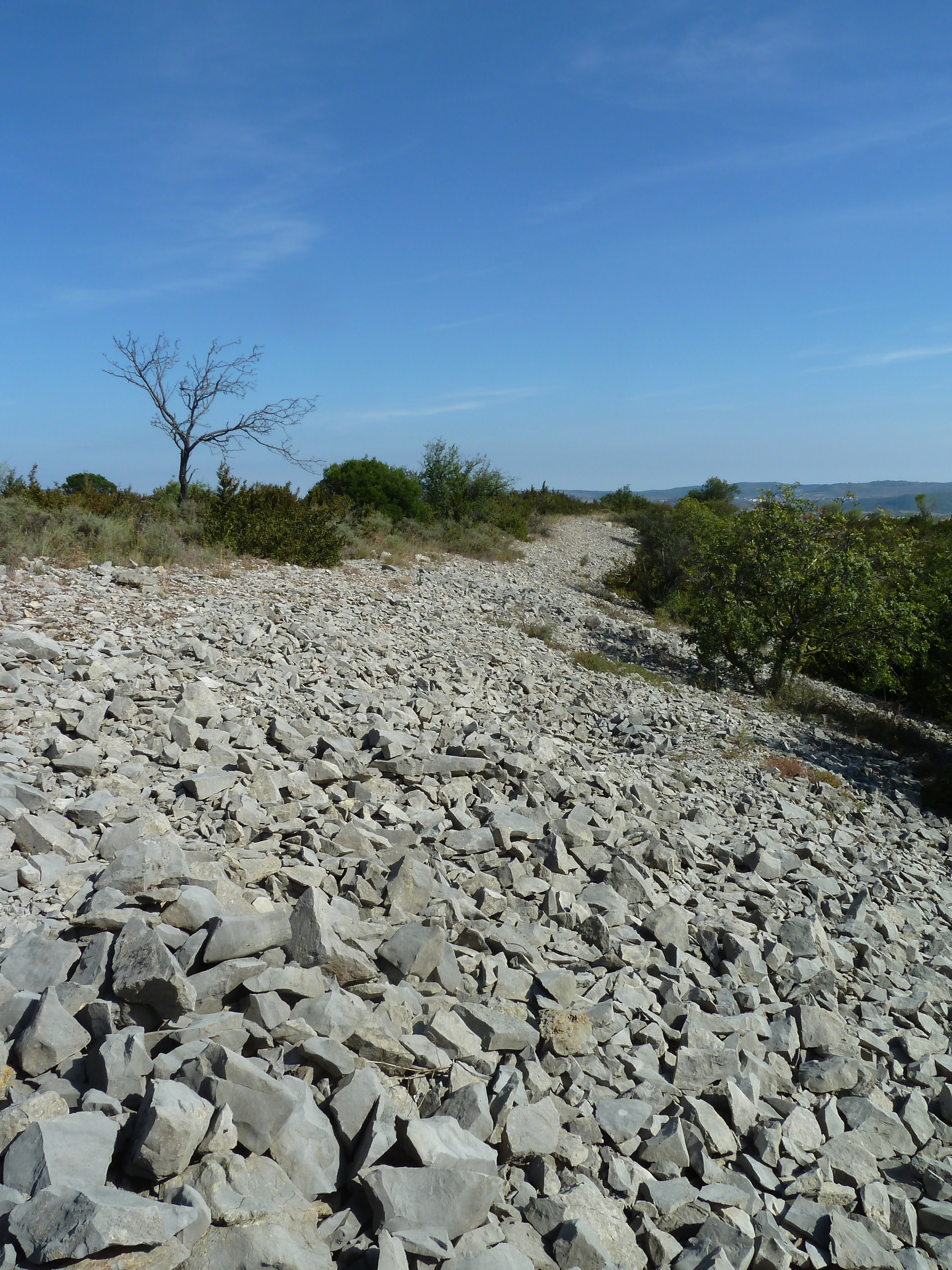
- The Oppidum de Jastres-Sud

- Coat of arms
- Location of Lavilledieu
- Location within France Location within Auvergne-Rhône-Alpes
- Coordinates: 44°34′35″N 4°27′14″E
- Country: France
- Region: Auvergne-Rhône-Alpes
- Department: Ardèche
- Arrondissement: Largentière
- Canton: Berg-Helvie
- Intercommunality: Bassin d'Aubenas

Government
  - Mayor (2020–2026): Gérard Saucles
- Area^{1}: 14.65 km^{2} (5.66 sq mi)
- Elevation: 222 m (728 ft)
- Highest elevation: 371 m (1,217 ft)
- Lowest elevation: 196 m (643 ft)
- Population (2023): 2,264
  - Density: 154.5/km^{2} (400.3/sq mi)
- Time zone: UTC+01:00 (CET)
  - Summer (DST): UTC+02:00 (CEST)
- INSEE/Postal code: 07138 /07170
- ^{1} French Land Register data, which excludes lakes, ponds, glaciers > 1 km^{2} (0.386 sq mi or 247 acres) and river estuaries.

Lavilledieu (French pronunciation: [lavildjø]; Occitan: Laviladieu) is a commune in the Ardèche department in southern France.

== Geography ==
=== Location and Description ===
Lavilledieu is situated in the district of Villeneuve-de-Berg. Located near the Rhône valley, it is one of the numerous localities crossed by the National Route 102, a highway linking important traffic between Montélimar and Puy-en-Velay. Lavilledieu contains an activity zone called "Les Persèdes", which unites many companies, including the Center of Waste Management and the Recycling Center (SIDOMSA) of the Aubenas region. Near the end of 2013, the commune also welcomed a crematorium, the second to be established in Ardèche; the first is in Bourg-Saint-Andéol. Lavilledieu is separated from other French cities by the following distances in kilometers:

- Aubenas: 10 km
- Vallon-Pont-d'Arc: 24 km
- Montélimar: 31 km
- Privas: 34 km
- Alès: 71 km
- Valence: 77 km
- Orange: 81 km
- Romans-sur-Isère: 97 km
- Le Puy-en-Velay: 103 km
- Avignon: 108 km
- Mende: 122 km
- Nîmes: 132 km
- Montpellier: 147 km
- Grenoble: 169 km
- Lyon: 177 km
- Marseille: 193 km
- Paris: 639 km

Lavilledieu borders six other communes, all located in the Ardèche department.

=== Hydrography ===
The Auzon commune crosses the municipal territory from its source in the Coiron plateau before rejoining the Ardèche (right bank) at Lanas along a north-south axis.

=== Climate ===
In 2010, the climate of the commune was an altered Mediterranean climate, according to a CNRS study based on a series of data covering the period 1971–2000. In 2020, Météo-France published a typology of the climates of metropolitan France in which the commune is exposed to a mountain climate or mountain-outskirts climate and is in the Provence climatic region, Languedoc-Roussillon, characterized by low rainfall in summer, lots of sunshine (2,600 hours/year), a hot summer (21.5 °C), very dry air in summer, dry in all seasons, strong winds (40 to 50% wind frequency > 5 m/s), and little fog.

Between 1971–2000, the average annual temperature was 12.5 °C, with an annual thermal range of 17.6 °C. The average annual cumulative precipitation is 988 mm, with 7 days of precipitation in January and 4.4 days in July. Between 1991–2020, the average annual temperature observed at the nearest Météo-France meteorological station, “Mirabel Sa”, in the commune of Mirabel, 5 km as the crow flies, is 13.4 °C and the average annual cumulative precipitation was 998.1 mm. The municipality's climate parameters estimated for 2050 according to different greenhouse gas emission scenarios can be consulted on a dedicated site published by Météo-France in November 2022.

=== Communication Routes ===
The municipal territory is crossed by National Route 102 (RN 102), which connects the A75 motorway in Lempdes-sur-Allagnon to National Route 7 (RN 7) and the A7 motorway in Montélimar.

== Population ==
Historical population
Year	Pop.	±% p.a.
1968	640	—
1975	854	+4.21%
1982	930	+1.23%
1990	1,264	+3.91%
1999	1,430	+1.38%
2007	1,799	+2.91%
2012	1,995	+2.09%
2017	2,122	+1.24%
2023	2,264	+1.09%
Source: INSEE

== See also ==
- Communes of the Ardèche department
