= Lentillères =

- Commune
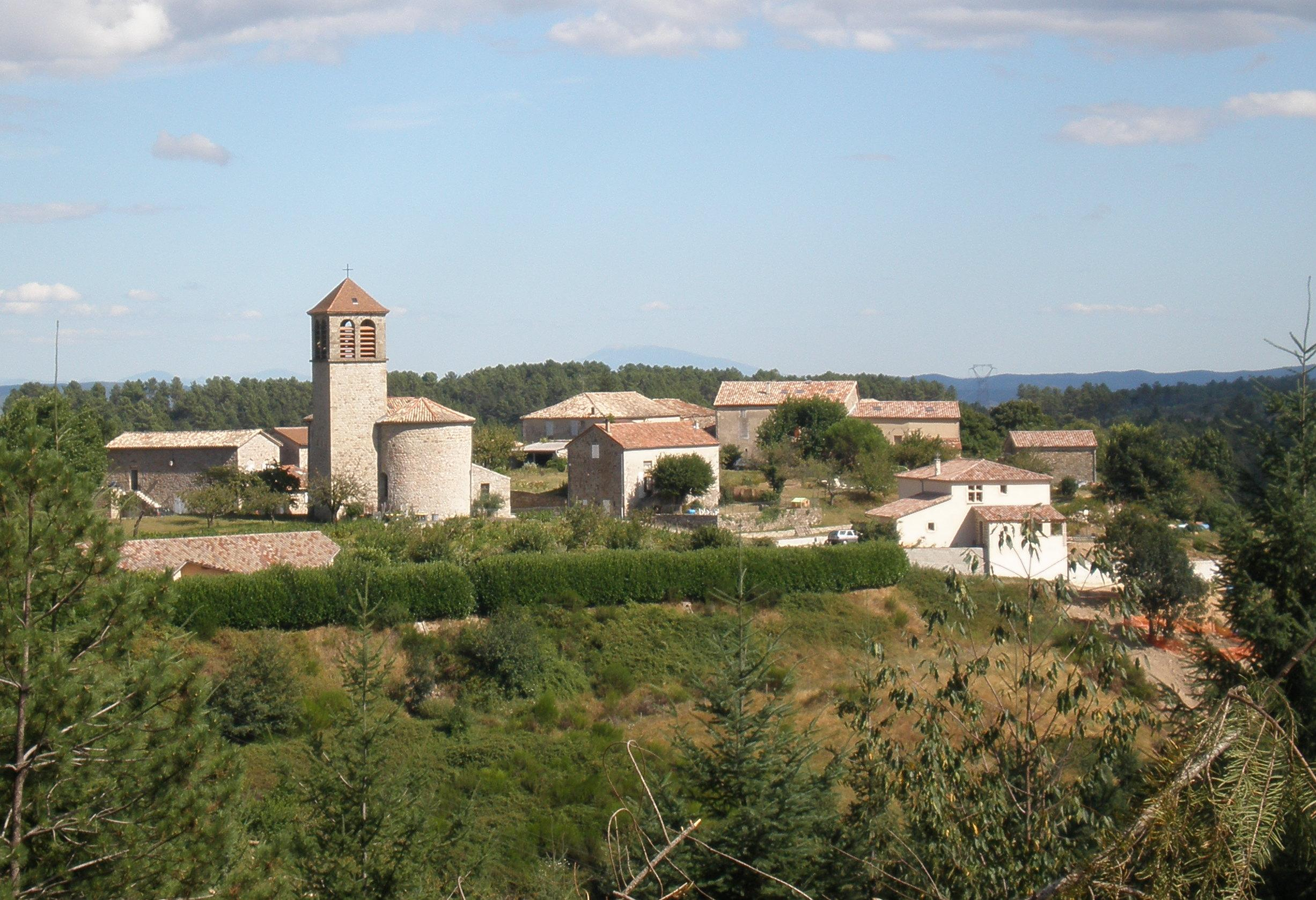
- The church and surrounding buildings in Lentillères
- Location of Lentillères
- Location within France Location within Auvergne-Rhône-Alpes
- Coordinates: 44°36′52″N 4°18′52″E
- Country: France
- Region: Auvergne-Rhône-Alpes
- Department: Ardèche
- Arrondissement: Largentière
- Canton: Aubenas-2

Government
  - Mayor (2020–2026): Pascal Dupont
- Area^{1}: 8.72 km^{2} (3.37 sq mi)
- Elevation: 550 m (1,800 ft)
- Highest elevation: 864 m (2,835 ft)
- Lowest elevation: 298 m (978 ft)
- Population (2023): 236
  - Density: 27.1/km^{2} (70.1/sq mi)
- Time zone: UTC+01:00 (CET)
  - Summer (DST): UTC+02:00 (CEST)
- INSEE/Postal code: 07141 /07200
- ^{1} French Land Register data, which excludes lakes, ponds, glaciers > 1 km^{2} (0.386 sq mi or 247 acres) and river estuaries.

Lentillères (French pronunciation: [lɑ̃tijɛʁ]; Occitan: Lentilhèiras) is a commune in the Ardèche department in southern France.

== Population ==
Historical population
Year	Pop.	±% p.a.
1968	121	—
1975	104	−2.14%
1982	121	+2.19%
1990	151	+2.81%
1999	175	+1.65%
2007	205	+2.00%
2012	228	+2.15%
2017	231	+0.26%
2023	236	+0.36%
Source: INSEE

== See also ==
- Communes of the Ardèche department
