= Saint-Étienne-de-Boulogne =

- Commune
- Coat of arms
- Location of Saint-Étienne-de-Boulogne
- Location within France Location within Auvergne-Rhône-Alpes
- Coordinates: 44°42′06″N 4°27′35″E
- Country: France
- Region: Auvergne-Rhône-Alpes
- Department: Ardèche
- Arrondissement: Largentière
- Canton: Aubenas-2

Government
  - Mayor (2020–2026): Georges Antony
- Area^{1}: 14.97 km^{2} (5.78 sq mi)
- Elevation: 510 m (1,670 ft)
- Highest elevation: 1,019 m (3,343 ft)
- Lowest elevation: 387 m (1,270 ft)
- Population (2023): 399
  - Density: 26.7/km^{2} (69.0/sq mi)
- Time zone: UTC+01:00 (CET)
  - Summer (DST): UTC+02:00 (CEST)
- INSEE/Postal code: 07230 /07200
- ^{1} French Land Register data, which excludes lakes, ponds, glaciers > 1 km^{2} (0.386 sq mi or 247 acres) and river estuaries.

Saint-Étienne-de-Boulogne (French pronunciation: [sɛ̃.t‿etjɛn də bulɔɲ]; Vivaro-Alpine: Sant Estève de Bolonha) is a commune in the Ardèche department in southern France.

== Population ==
Historical population
Year	Pop.	±% p.a.
1968	280	—
1975	251	−1.55%
1982	255	+0.23%
1990	240	−0.75%
1999	297	+2.40%
2007	343	+1.82%
2012	384	+2.28%
2017	404	+1.02%
2023	399	−0.21%
Source: INSEE

== See also ==
- Communes of the Ardèche department
