= Saint-Michel-de-Boulogne =

- Commune
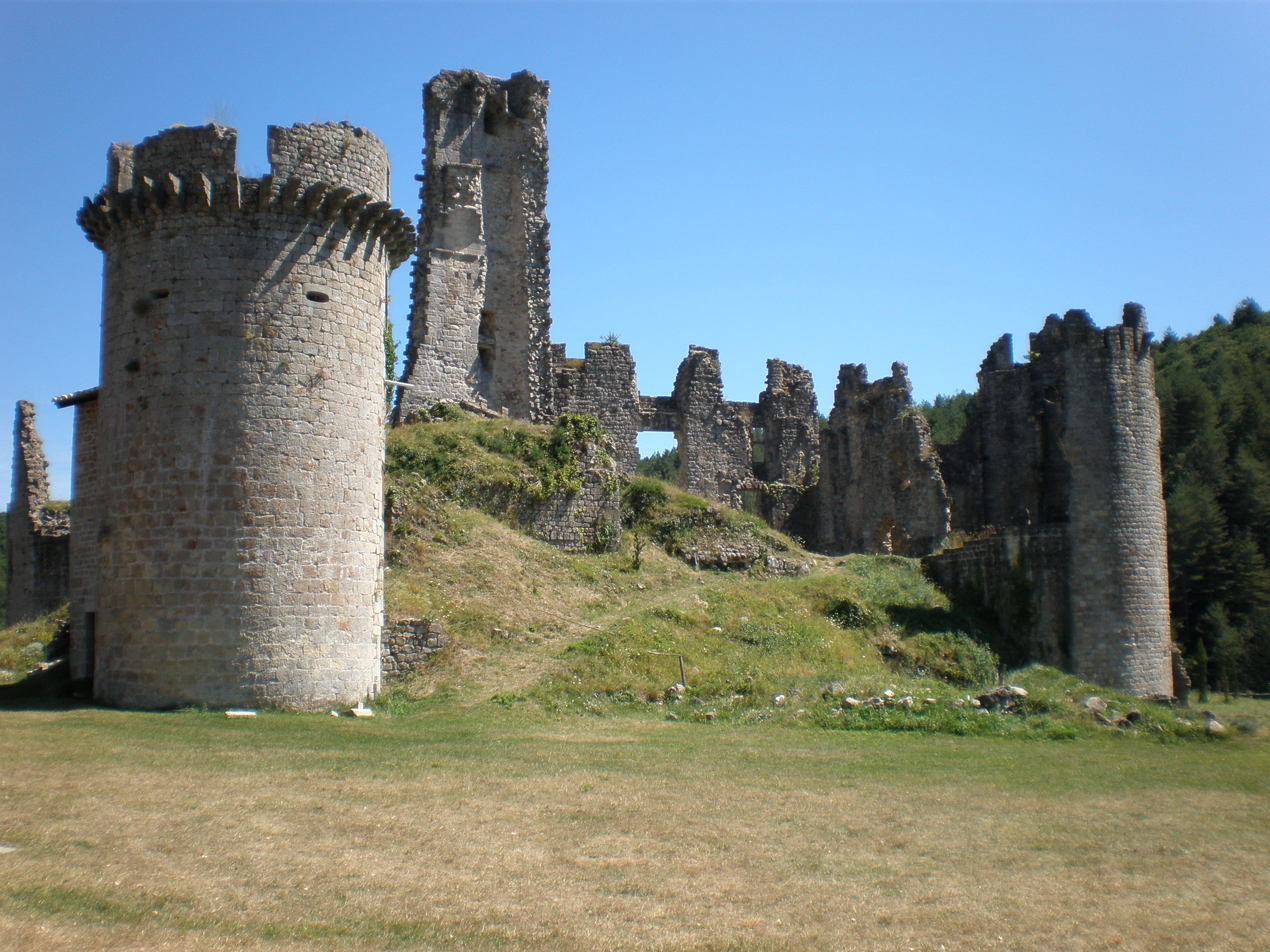
- The ruins of the chateau
- Location of Saint-Michel-de-Boulogne
- Location within France Location within Auvergne-Rhône-Alpes
- Coordinates: 44°41′47″N 4°26′02″E
- Country: France
- Region: Auvergne-Rhône-Alpes
- Department: Ardèche
- Arrondissement: Largentière
- Canton: Aubenas-2

Government
  - Mayor (2020–2026): Georges Fangier
- Area^{1}: 7.53 km^{2} (2.91 sq mi)
- Elevation: 451 m (1,480 ft)
- Highest elevation: 775 m (2,543 ft)
- Lowest elevation: 350 m (1,150 ft)
- Population (2023): 149
  - Density: 19.8/km^{2} (51.2/sq mi)
- Time zone: UTC+01:00 (CET)
  - Summer (DST): UTC+02:00 (CEST)
- INSEE/Postal code: 07277 /07200
- ^{1} French Land Register data, which excludes lakes, ponds, glaciers > 1 km^{2} (0.386 sq mi or 247 acres) and river estuaries.

Saint-Michel-de-Boulogne (French pronunciation: [sɛ̃ miʃɛl də bulɔɲ]; Occitan: Sant Michèu de Bolonha) is a commune in the Ardèche department in southern France.

== Population ==
Historical population
Year	Pop.	±% p.a.
1968	111	—
1975	101	−1.34%
1982	106	+0.69%
1990	96	−1.23%
1999	130	+3.43%
2007	141	+1.02%
2012	146	+0.70%
2017	156	+1.33%
2023	149	−0.76%
Source: INSEE

== See also ==
- Communes of the Ardèche department
