= Saint-Sernin, Ardèche =

Saint-Sernin
- Commune
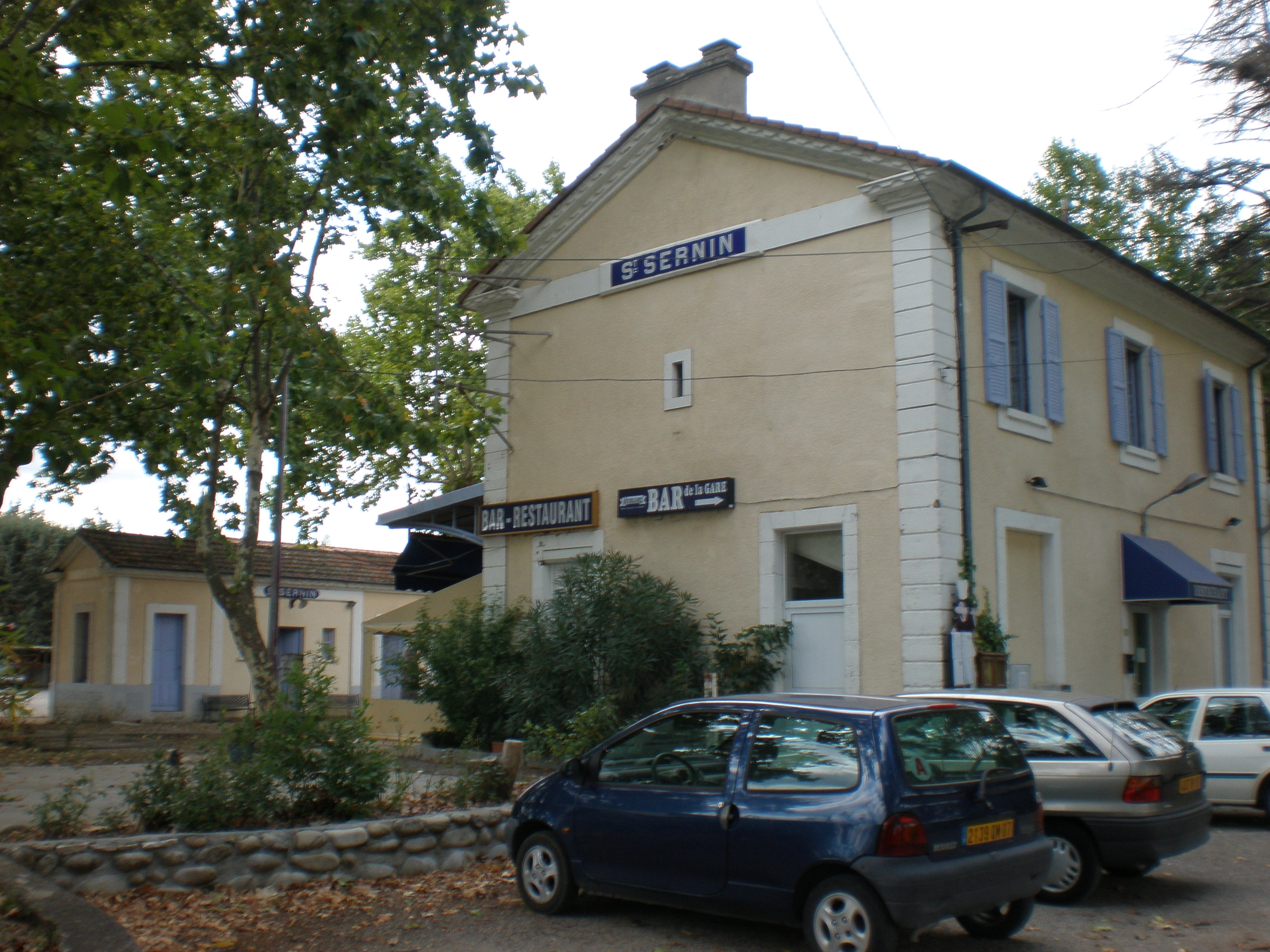
- The former railway station
- Location of Saint-Sernin
- Location within France Location within Auvergne-Rhône-Alpes
- Coordinates: 44°34′20″N 4°23′33″E
- Country: France
- Region: Auvergne-Rhône-Alpes
- Department: Ardèche
- Arrondissement: Largentière
- Canton: Aubenas-2

Government
  - Mayor (2020–2026): Max Chaze
- Area^{1}: 5.78 km^{2} (2.23 sq mi)
- Elevation: 186 m (610 ft)
- Highest elevation: 365 m (1,198 ft)
- Lowest elevation: 167 m (548 ft)
- Population (2023): 1,872
  - Density: 324/km^{2} (839/sq mi)
- Time zone: UTC+01:00 (CET)
  - Summer (DST): UTC+02:00 (CEST)
- INSEE/Postal code: 07296 /07200
- ^{1} French Land Register data, which excludes lakes, ponds, glaciers > 1 km^{2} (0.386 sq mi or 247 acres) and river estuaries.

Saint-Sernin (French pronunciation: [sɛ̃ sɛʁnɛ̃]; Occitan: Sant Sarnin) is a commune in the Ardèche department in southern France.

== Population ==
Historical population
Year	Pop.	±% p.a.
1968	581	—
1975	702	+2.74%
1982	849	+2.75%
1990	1,017	+2.28%
1999	1,147	+1.35%
2007	1,453	+3.00%
2012	1,632	+2.35%
2017	1,663	+0.38%
2023	1,872	+1.99%
Source: INSEE

== See also ==
- Communes of the Ardèche department
