= Lanas =

- Commune
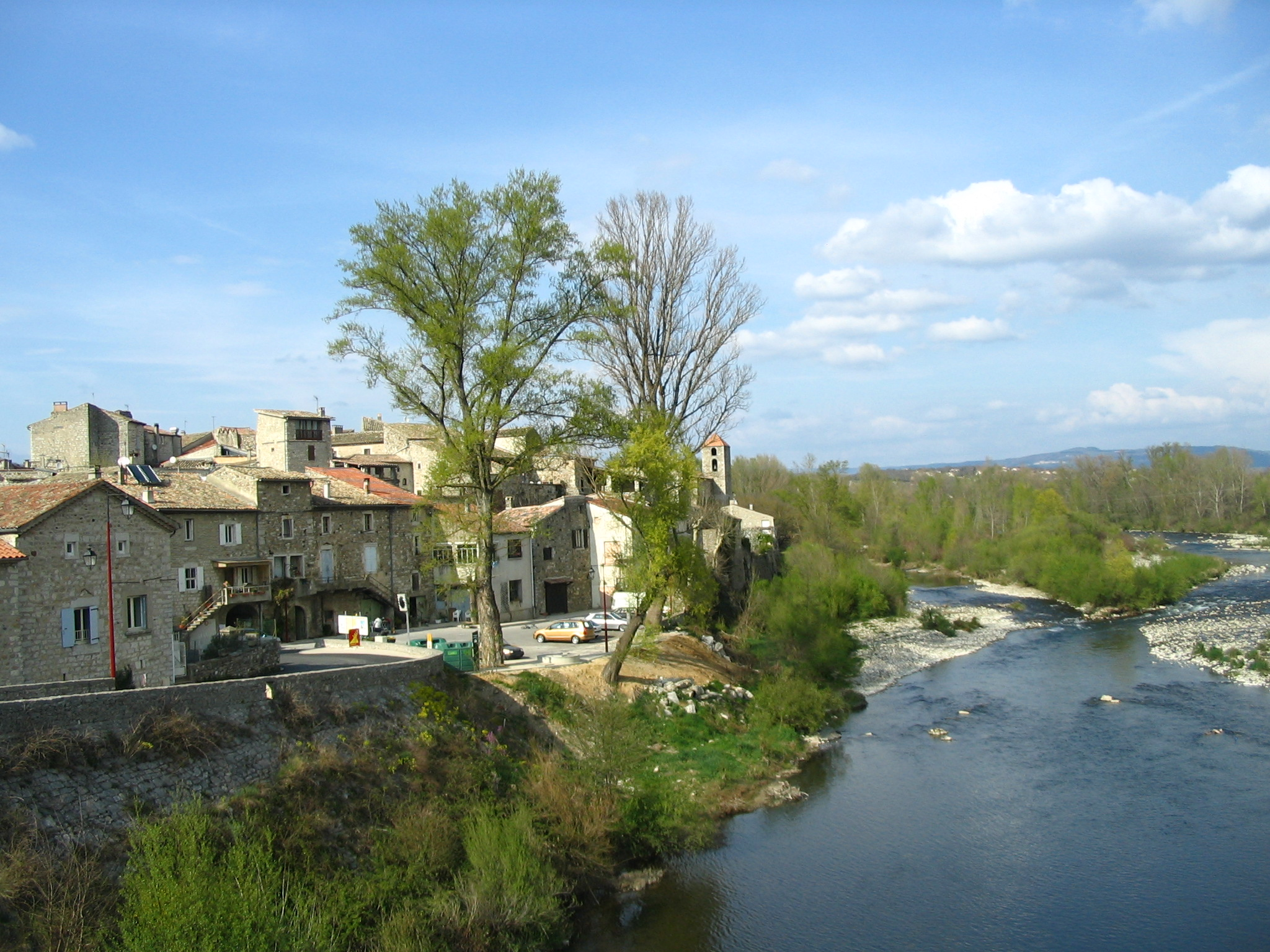
- Lanas alongside the Ardèche
- Location of Lanas
- Location within France Location within Auvergne-Rhône-Alpes
- Coordinates: 44°31′55″N 4°24′02″E
- Country: France
- Region: Auvergne-Rhône-Alpes
- Department: Ardèche
- Arrondissement: Largentière
- Canton: Aubenas-2

Government
  - Mayor (2023–2026): Vincent Cervino
- Area^{1}: 9.85 km^{2} (3.80 sq mi)
- Elevation: 130 m (430 ft)
- Highest elevation: 318 m (1,043 ft)
- Lowest elevation: 127 m (417 ft)
- Population (2023): 429
  - Density: 43.6/km^{2} (113/sq mi)
- Time zone: UTC+01:00 (CET)
  - Summer (DST): UTC+02:00 (CEST)
- INSEE/Postal code: 07131 /07200
- ^{1} French Land Register data, which excludes lakes, ponds, glaciers > 1 km^{2} (0.386 sq mi or 247 acres) and river estuaries.

Lanas is a commune in the Ardèche department in southern France.

== Population ==
Historical population
Year	Pop.	±% p.a.
1968	217	—
1975	196	−1.44%
1982	211	+1.06%
1990	273	+3.27%
1999	325	+1.96%
2007	377	+1.87%
2012	374	−0.16%
2017	430	+2.83%
2023	429	−0.04%
Source: INSEE

== See also ==
- Communes of the Ardèche department
