= Fons, Ardèche =

Fons
- Commune
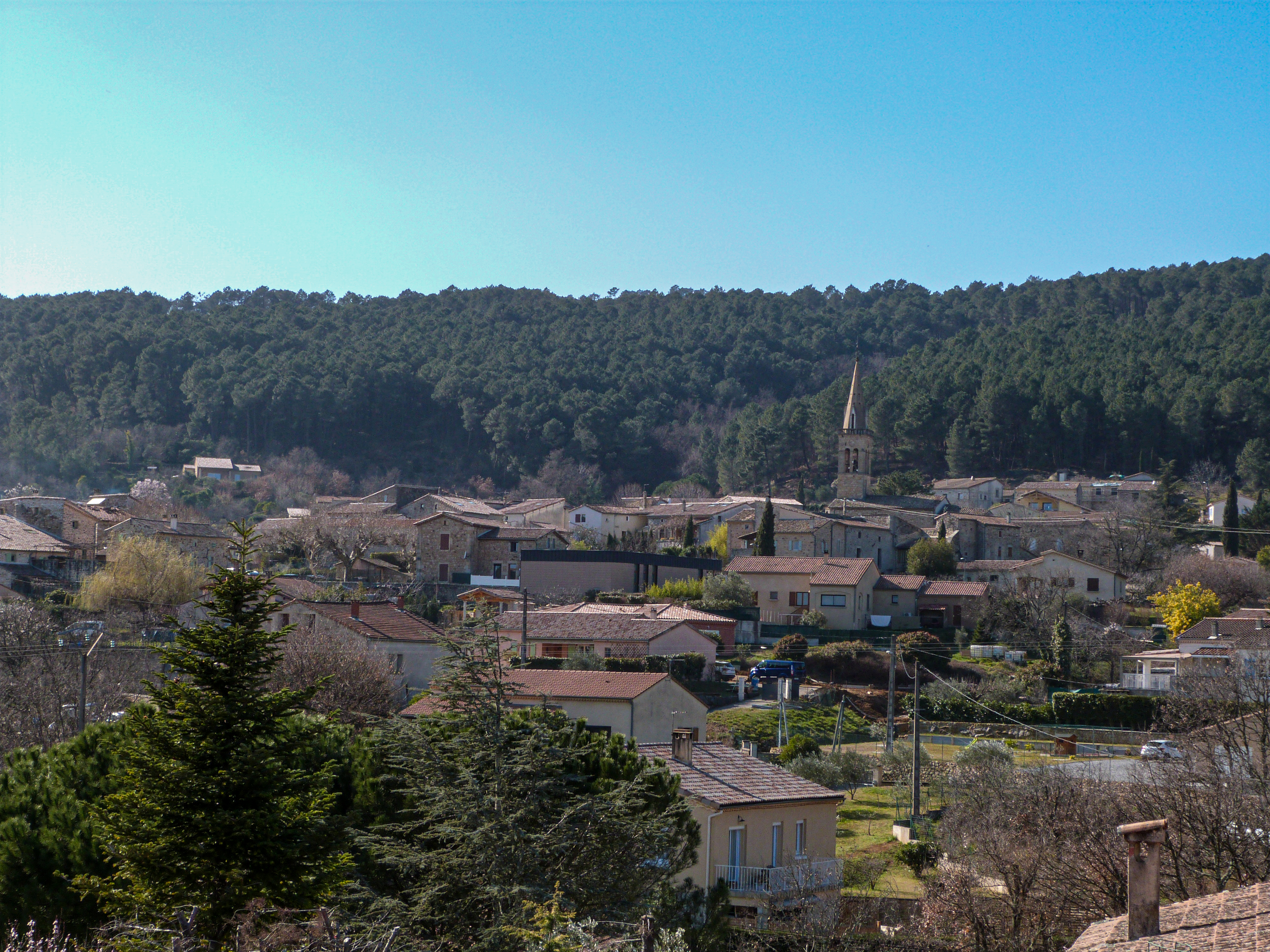
- Location of Fons
- Location within France Location within Auvergne-Rhône-Alpes
- Coordinates: 44°35′03″N 4°20′58″E
- Country: France
- Region: Auvergne-Rhône-Alpes
- Department: Ardèche
- Arrondissement: Largentière
- Canton: Aubenas-2
- Intercommunality: Bassin d'Aubenas

Government
  - Mayor (2020–2026): Patrick Maisonneuve
- Area^{1}: 4.03 km^{2} (1.56 sq mi)
- Elevation: 300 m (980 ft)
- Highest elevation: 492 m (1,614 ft)
- Lowest elevation: 232 m (761 ft)
- Population (2023): 316
  - Density: 78.4/km^{2} (203/sq mi)
- Time zone: UTC+01:00 (CET)
  - Summer (DST): UTC+02:00 (CEST)
- INSEE/Postal code: 07091 /07200
- ^{1} French Land Register data, which excludes lakes, ponds, glaciers > 1 km^{2} (0.386 sq mi or 247 acres) and river estuaries.

Fons is a commune in the Ardèche department in southern France.

== Population ==
Historical population
Year	Pop.	±% p.a.
1968	128	—
1975	116	−1.40%
1982	133	+1.97%
1990	212	+6.00%
1999	264	+2.47%
2007	291	+1.22%
2012	320	+1.92%
2017	329	+0.56%
2023	316	−0.67%
Source: INSEE

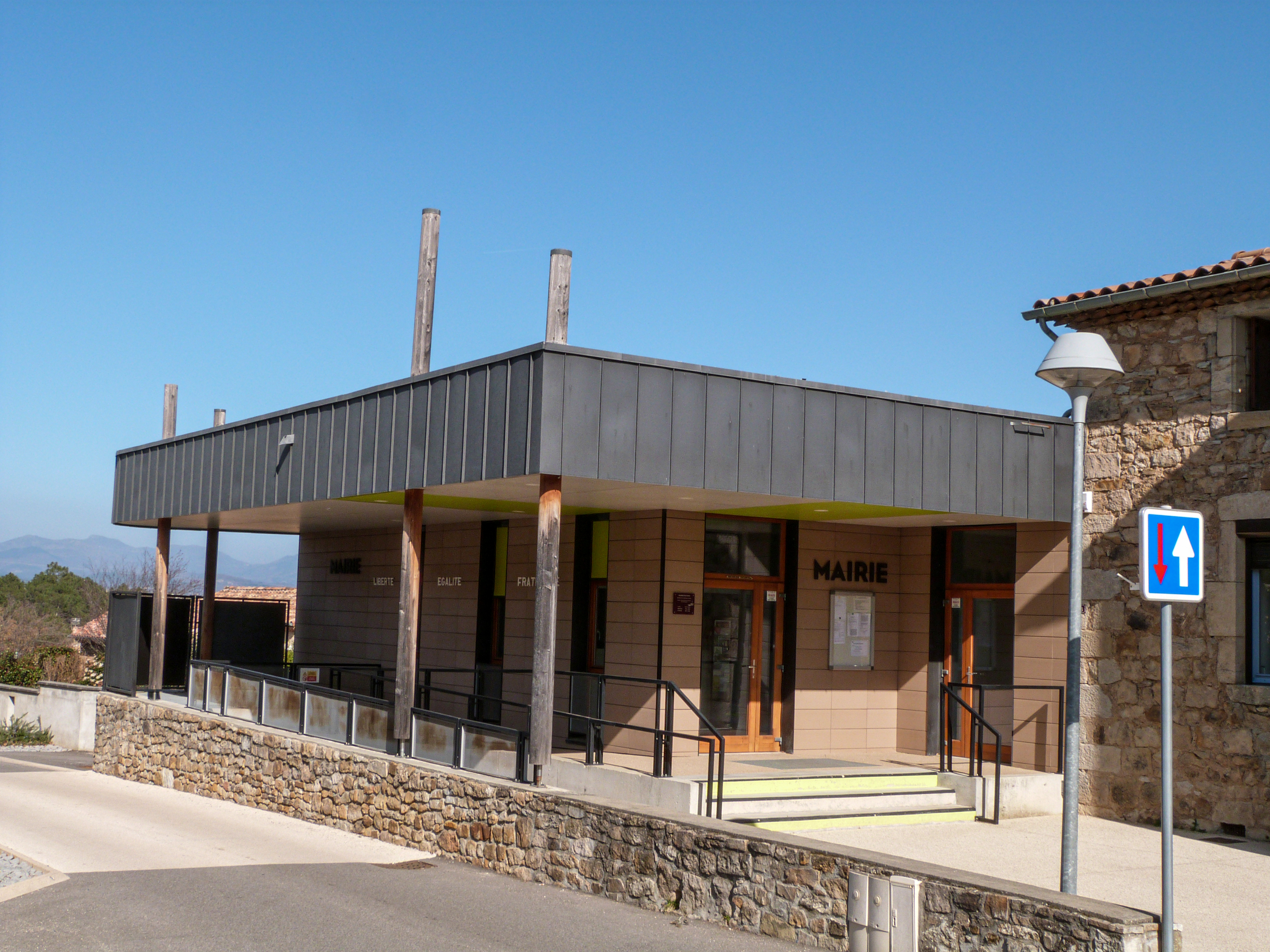
City hall.

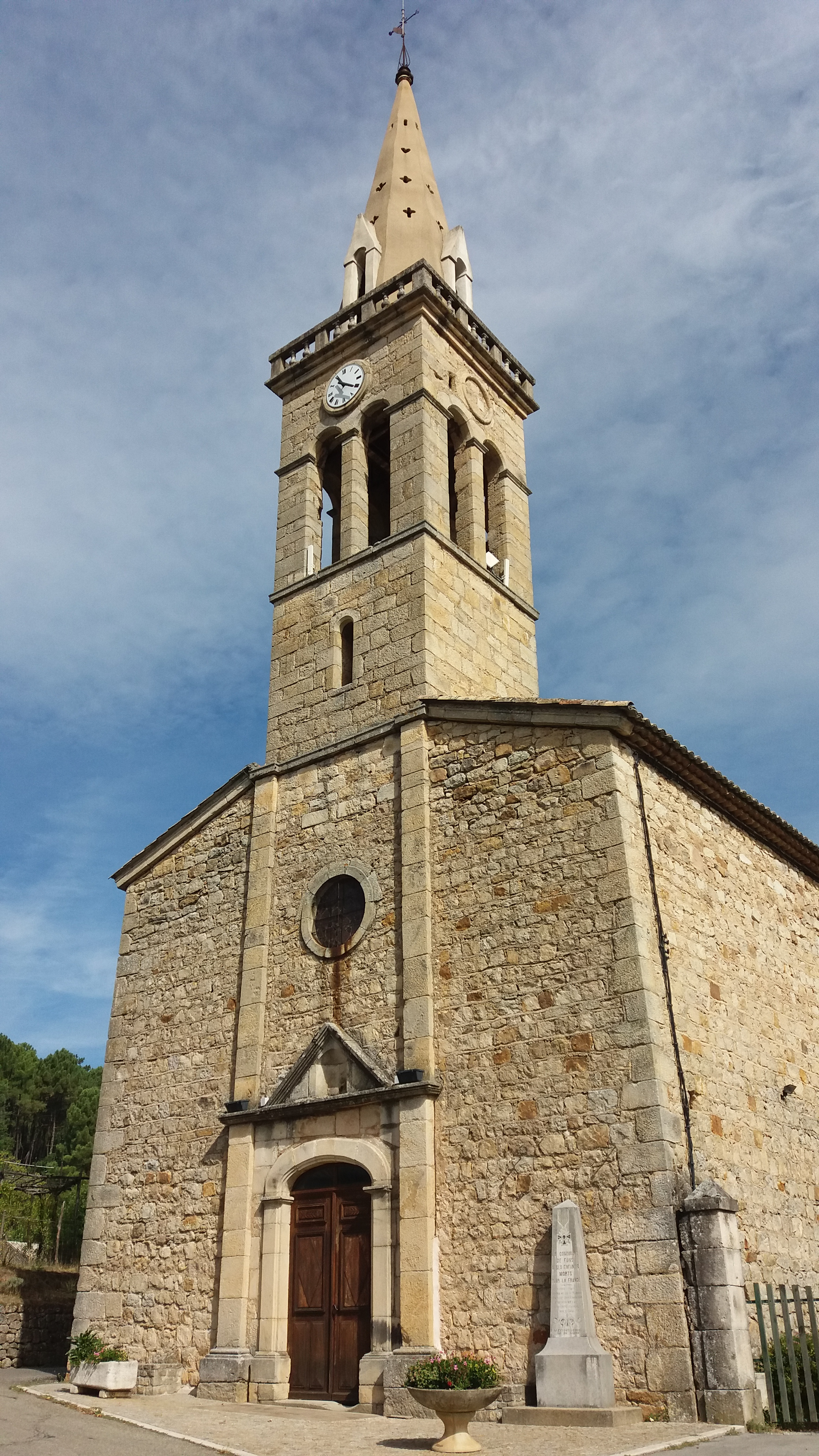
Church.

== See also ==
- Communes of the Ardèche department
