= Lachapelle-sous-Aubenas =

- Commune
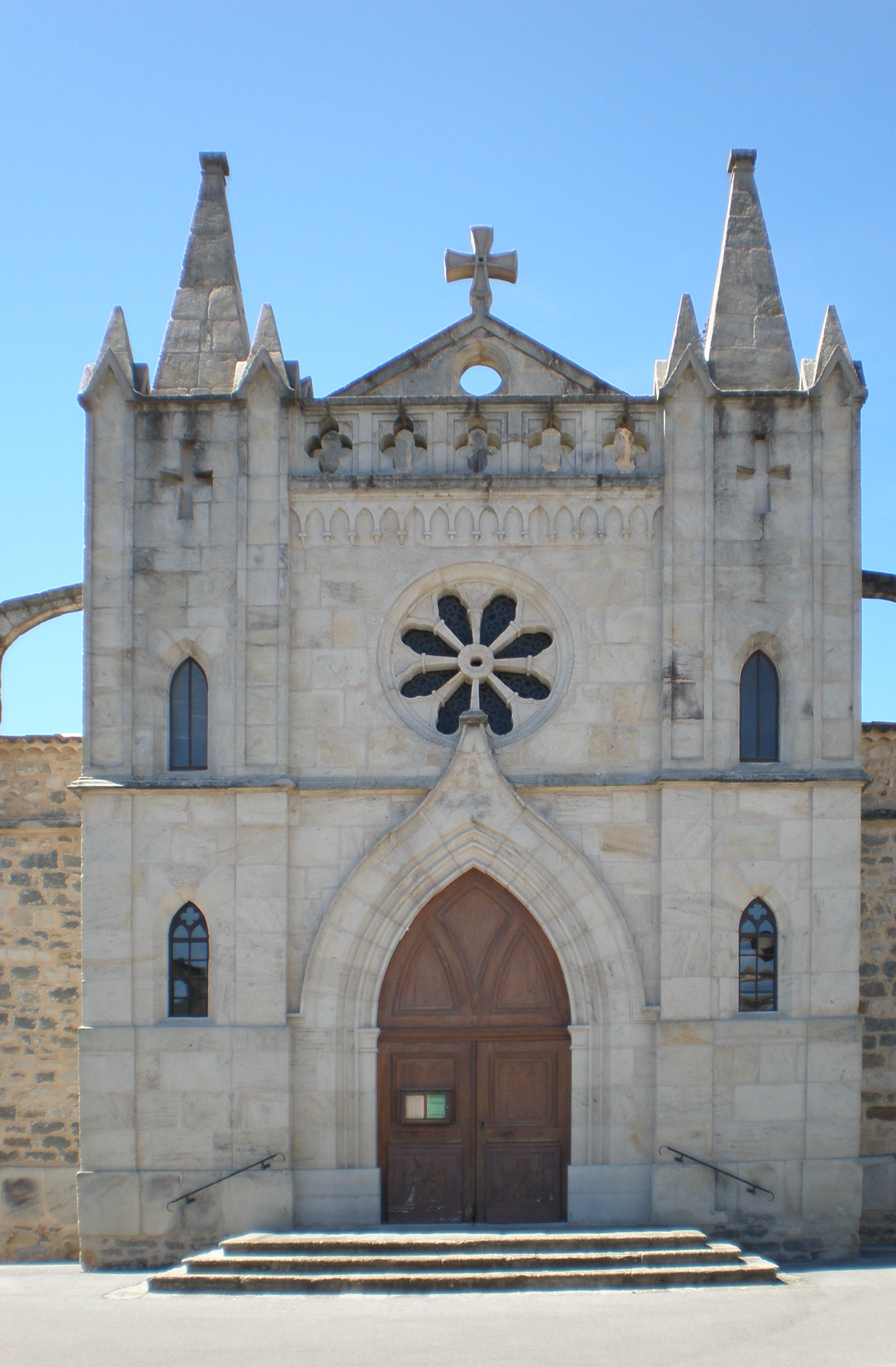
- The church in Lachapelle-sous-Aubenas
- Location of Lachapelle-sous-Aubenas
- Location within France Location within Auvergne-Rhône-Alpes
- Coordinates: 44°33′54″N 4°21′53″E
- Country: France
- Region: Auvergne-Rhône-Alpes
- Department: Ardèche
- Arrondissement: Largentière
- Canton: Aubenas-2

Government
  - Mayor (2020–2026): Sandrine Genest
- Area^{1}: 10.12 km^{2} (3.91 sq mi)
- Elevation: 205 m (673 ft)
- Highest elevation: 449 m (1,473 ft)
- Lowest elevation: 178 m (584 ft)
- Population (2023): 1,911
  - Density: 188.8/km^{2} (489.1/sq mi)
- Time zone: UTC+01:00 (CET)
  - Summer (DST): UTC+02:00 (CEST)
- INSEE/Postal code: 07122 /07200
- ^{1} French Land Register data, which excludes lakes, ponds, glaciers > 1 km^{2} (0.386 sq mi or 247 acres) and river estuaries.

Lachapelle-sous-Aubenas (French pronunciation: [laʃapɛl su.z‿obna], literally Lachapelle under Aubenas) is a commune in the Ardèche department in southern France.

== Population ==
Historical population
Year	Pop.	±% p.a.
1968	511	—
1975	631	+3.06%
1982	840	+4.17%
1990	1,107	+3.51%
1999	1,259	+1.44%
2007	1,402	+1.35%
2012	1,504	+1.41%
2017	1,604	+1.30%
2023	1,911	+2.96%
Source: INSEE

== See also ==
- Communes of the Ardèche department
