= Accons =

- Commune
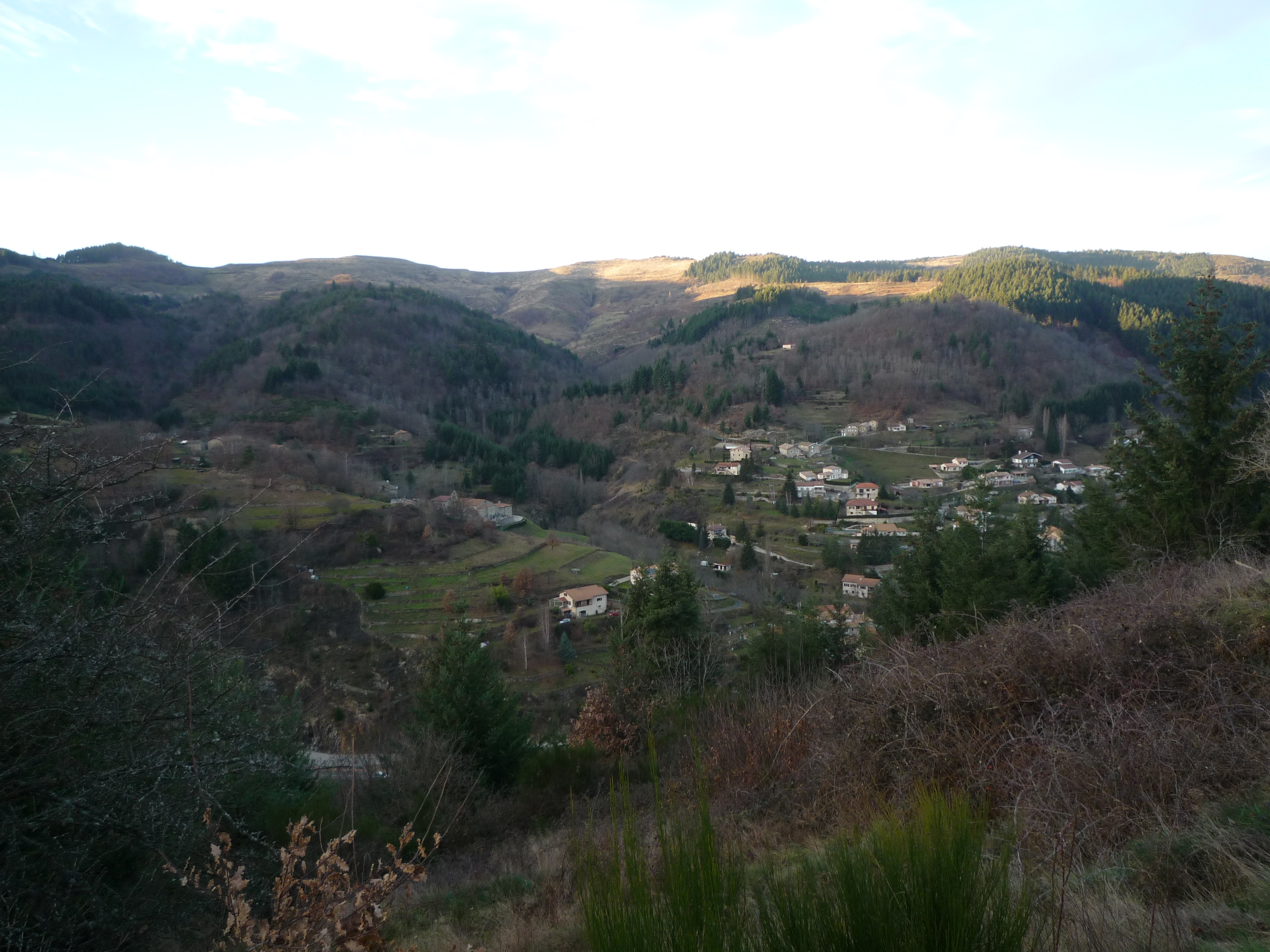
- A view towards Mariac from Accons
- Location of Accons
- Location within France Location within Auvergne-Rhône-Alpes
- Coordinates: 44°53′14″N 4°23′16″E
- Country: France
- Region: Auvergne-Rhône-Alpes
- Department: Ardèche
- Arrondissement: Tournon-sur-Rhône
- Canton: Haut-Eyrieux
- Intercommunality: Val'Eyrieux

Government
  - Mayor (2020–2026): Josette Clauzier
- Area^{1}: 9.87 km^{2} (3.81 sq mi)
- Elevation: 560 m (1,840 ft)
- Highest elevation: 1,201 m (3,940 ft)
- Lowest elevation: 476 m (1,562 ft)
- Population (2023): 361
  - Density: 36.6/km^{2} (94.7/sq mi)
- Time zone: UTC+01:00 (CET)
  - Summer (DST): UTC+02:00 (CEST)
- INSEE/Postal code: 07001 /07160
- ^{1} French Land Register data, which excludes lakes, ponds, glaciers > 1 km^{2} (0.386 sq mi or 247 acres) and river estuaries.

Accons is a commune in the Ardèche department in the Auvergne-Rhône-Alpes region of southern France.

== Geography ==
Accons is located in the arrondissement of Tournon-sur-Rhone and the canton of Haut-Eyrieux, 4 km south-west of Le Cheylard and some 50 km south-east of Le Puy-en-Velay. The only road into Accons is the D578 running west from Le Cheylard and continuing to Mariac. Accons village is accessed by the Accons road or La Mothe road which both branch off the D578. In the north of the commune is the hamlet of Villebrion which is also accessed by small mountain roads.

The Dorne river crosses the commune from west to east north of the village as it flows east to join the Eyrieux at Le Cheylard. Many tributaries feed the Dorne from the commune: in the north the Ruisseau des Combes forms the western border as it flows south to join the Dorne; in the south many streams flow north to join the Dorne including the Ruisseau de Praderne which forms part of the western border before joining the Dorne and the Ruisseau de Boure flows north through the centre of the commune.

== Administration ==
List of Successive Mayors of Accons

From	To	Name
2001	2014	Bernadette Pinet-Cuoq
2014	Current	Josette Clauzier

== Population ==
The inhabitants are called Acconnais or Acconnaises in French.

Historical population

Year	Pop.	±% p.a.
1793	921	—
1800	933	+0.19%
1806	965	+0.56%
1821	813	−1.14%
1831	1,151	+3.54%
1836	1,038	−2.05%
1841	1,111	+1.37%
1846	1,080	−0.56%
1851	949	−2.55%
1856	716	−5.48%
1861	668	−1.38%
1866	655	−0.39%
1872	673	+0.45%
1876	620	−2.03%
1881	594	−0.85%
1886	659	+2.10%
1891	599	−1.89%
1896	581	−0.61%
1901	540	−1.45%

Year	Pop.	±% p.a.
1906	543	+0.11%
1911	514	−1.09%
1921	502	−0.24%
1926	457	−1.86%
1931	455	−0.09%
1936	436	−0.85%
1946	363	−1.82%
1954	359	−0.14%
1962	336	−0.82%
1968	277	−3.17%
1975	289	+0.61%
1982	378	+3.91%
1990	375	−0.10%
1999	419	+1.24%
2007	432	+0.38%
2012	416	−0.75%
2017	382	−1.69%
2023	361	−0.94%

Source: EHESS and INSEE

== Sites and Monuments ==
- The Château de la Mothe: a 15th to 16th century church with an attractive bell tower.

== See also ==
- Communes of the Ardèche department
