= Arcens =

- Commune
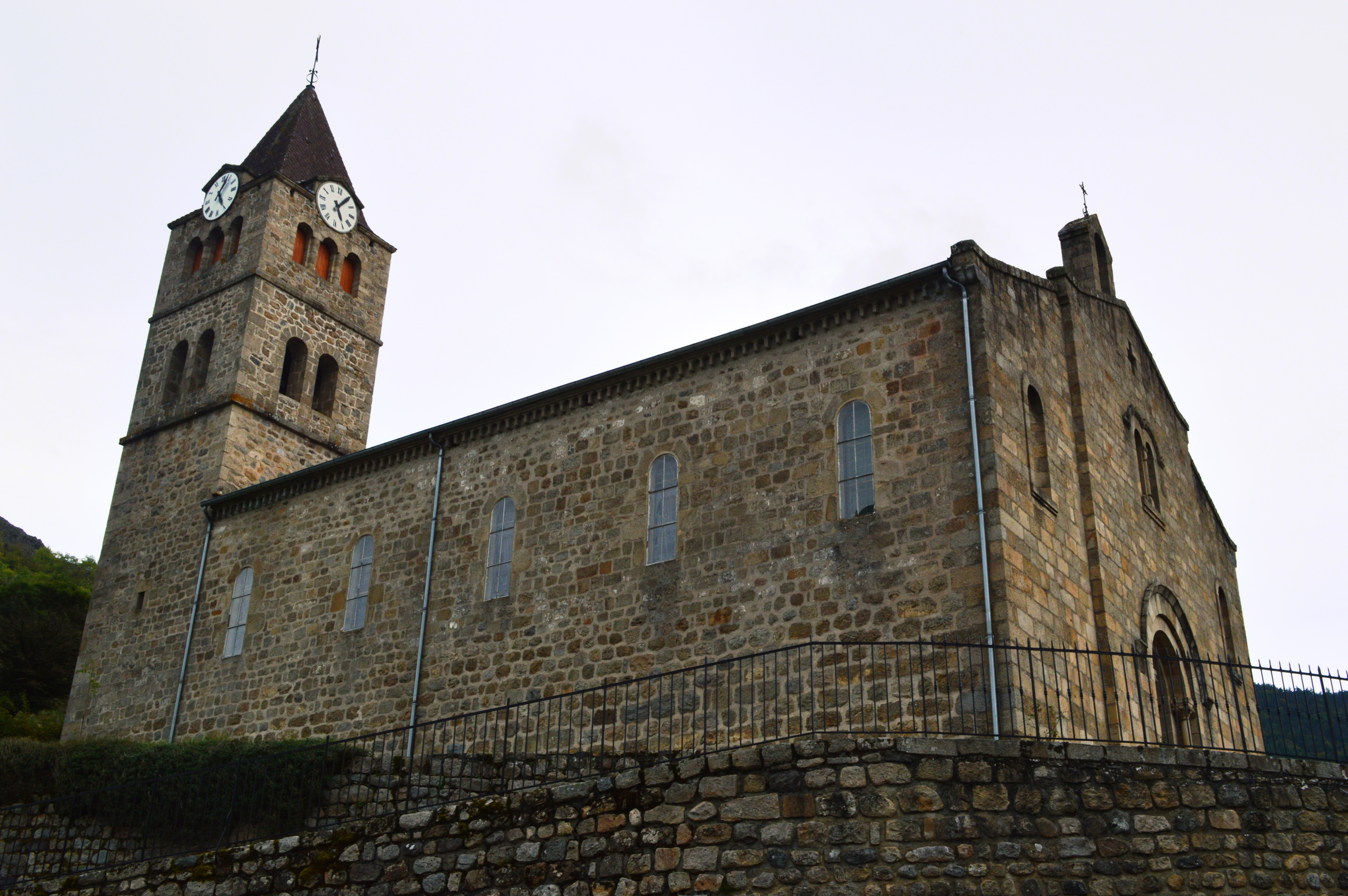
- The church in Arcens

- Coat of arms
- Location of Arcens
- Location within France Location within Auvergne-Rhône-Alpes
- Coordinates: 44°54′03″N 4°19′45″E
- Country: France
- Region: Auvergne-Rhône-Alpes
- Department: Ardèche
- Arrondissement: Tournon-sur-Rhône
- Canton: Haut-Eyrieux
- Intercommunality: CC Val'Eyrieux

Government
  - Mayor (2020–2026): Thierry Girot
- Area^{1}: 18.55 km^{2} (7.16 sq mi)
- Elevation: 600 m (2,000 ft)
- Highest elevation: 1,137 m (3,730 ft)
- Lowest elevation: 554 m (1,818 ft)
- Population (2023): 346
  - Density: 18.7/km^{2} (48.3/sq mi)
- Time zone: UTC+01:00 (CET)
  - Summer (DST): UTC+02:00 (CEST)
- INSEE/Postal code: 07012 /07310
- ^{1} French Land Register data, which excludes lakes, ponds, glaciers > 1 km^{2} (0.386 sq mi or 247 acres) and river estuaries.

Arcens (French pronunciation: [aʁsɑ̃s]) is a commune in the Ardèche department in the Auvergne-Rhône-Alpes region of southern France.

== Geography ==
Arcens is located some 55 km east by south-east of Le Puy-en-Velay and 60 km west of Valence. It can be accessed by the D237 road from Saint-Martin-de-Valamas in the north-east passing through the commune and the village and continuing south-west to Saint-Martial. Apart from the village there are also the hamlets of Massas and Les Allayauds in the south-west. The entire commune is heavily forested.

The Eysse river flows through the commune and the village from south-west to north-east gathering numerous tributaries on the way. It forms part of the northern border of the commune before continuing north to join the Eyrieux at Saint-Martin-de-Valamas.

== Toponymy ==
It appears that the origin of the commune name Arcens was from a hamlet in the 14th century and the area occupied by the current commune was divided between three Lords in 1464.

== History ==
Arcens is a village divided between the plateau and the valley and in the Middle Ages was the borders of three lordships (Brion, Chanéac, and Fourchades).

The first mention that is often recounted, of Mansus de Arcenno in 1024, does not apply to Arcens, but to a manse near Escoulenc (Saint-Andéol-d'Escoulenc in Erieux).

In 1164 Pope Alexander III confirmed the Arcens church to the chapter of Puy but this date is controversial.

On 17 April 1195 the next pope, Adrian IV, confirmed the church to the abbey of Saint-Chaffre.

In 1620, the Acens church depended on the chapter of Puy whose canons named the priests.

The Lordship of Arcens appears only in the 15th century in the Brion family: thence it passed to Crussol and in the 18th century was in the hands of the Aiguillon family, one of the most powerful of the time.

The revolutionary period left some traces: the sales of church property, theft from the tax collector, then a strange resignation of the council. The lord of Arcens (de Brion) was meanwhile guillotined.

== Administration ==
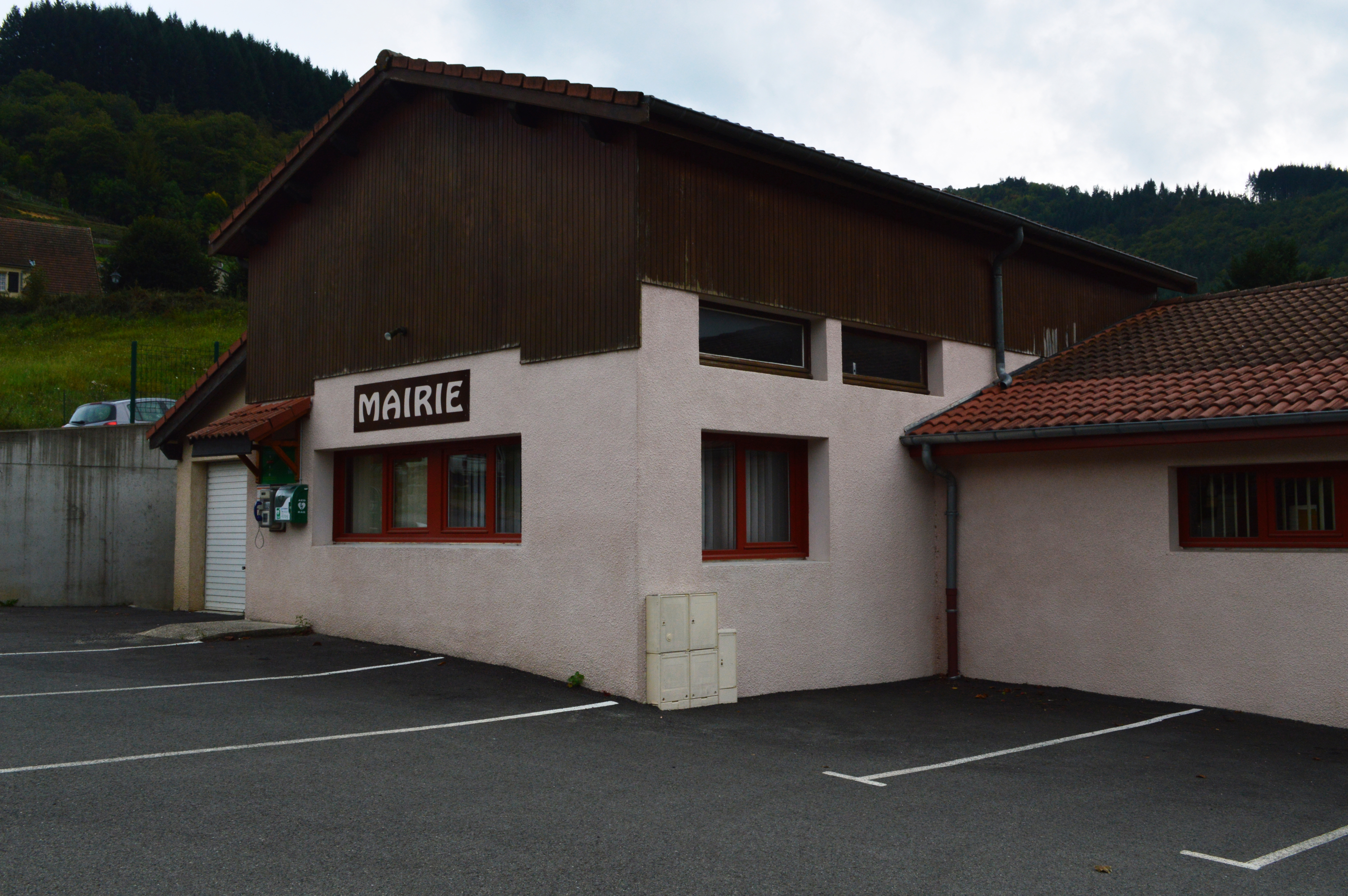
The Town Hall

List of Successive Mayors

From	To	Name	Party	Position
2001	2008	Hélène Mira	PS	Regional Councillor (1998-2006) (resigned)
2008	current	Thierry Girot	DVD	

== Demography ==
The inhabitants of the commune are known as Arcensois or Arcensoises in French.

Historical population

Year	Pop.	±% p.a.
1793	1,250	—
1800	1,170	−0.94%
1806	1,155	−0.21%
1821	1,160	+0.03%
1831	1,276	+0.96%
1836	1,295	+0.30%
1841	1,217	−1.23%
1846	1,215	−0.03%
1851	1,276	+0.98%
1856	1,219	−0.91%
1861	1,233	+0.23%
1866	1,225	−0.13%
1872	1,186	−0.54%
1876	1,227	+0.85%
1881	1,168	−0.98%
1886	1,188	+0.34%
1891	1,178	−0.17%
1896	1,083	−1.67%
1901	1,103	+0.37%

Year	Pop.	±% p.a.
1906	1,124	+0.38%
1911	1,049	−1.37%
1921	940	−1.09%
1926	800	−3.17%
1931	794	−0.15%
1936	744	−1.29%
1946	615	−1.89%
1954	580	−0.73%
1962	604	+0.51%
1968	576	−0.79%
1975	511	−1.70%
1982	484	−0.77%
1990	479	−0.13%
1999	452	−0.64%
2007	417	−1.00%
2012	360	−2.90%
2017	376	+0.87%
2023	346	−1.38%

Source: EHESS and INSEE

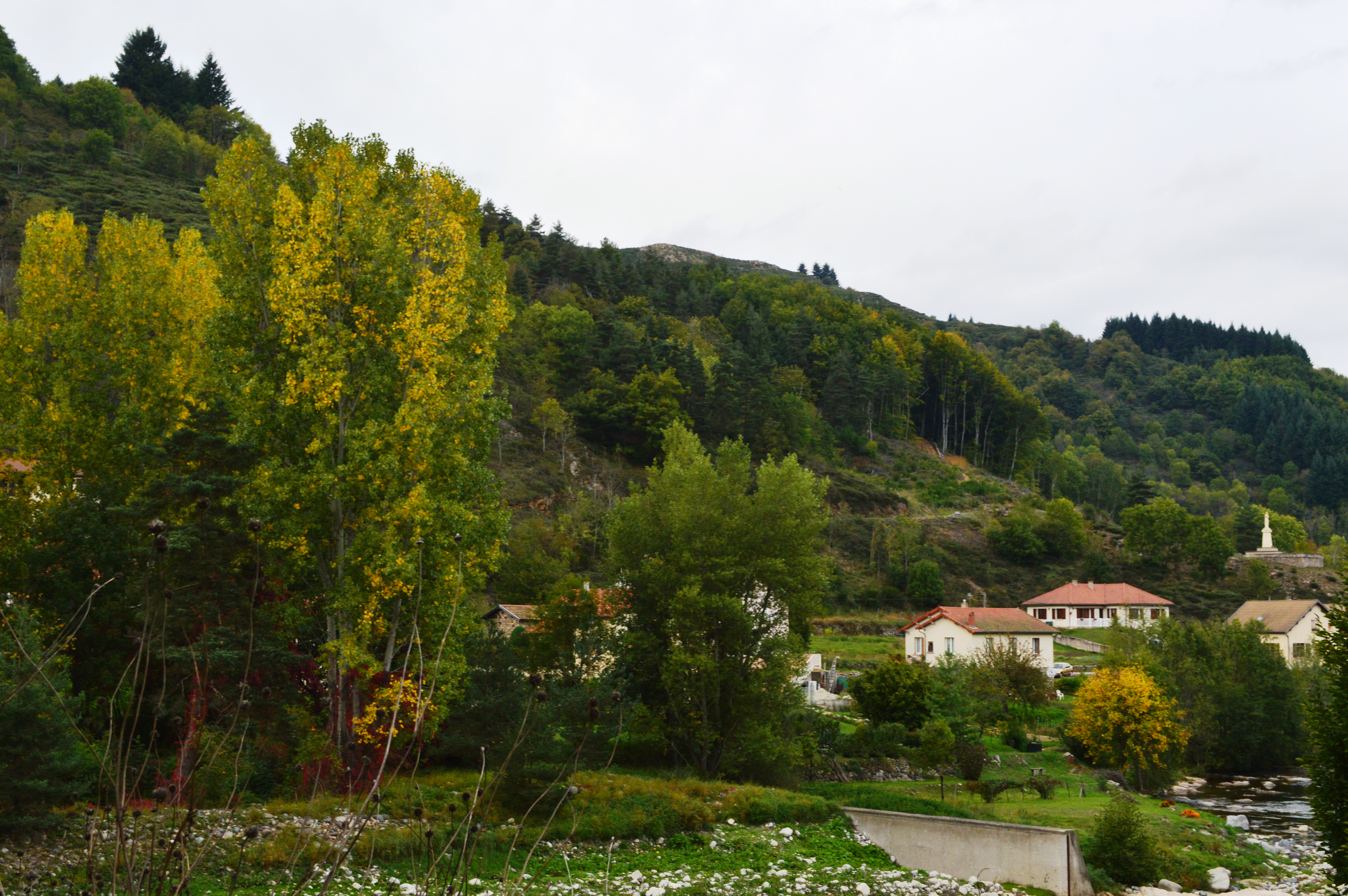
View over Arcens

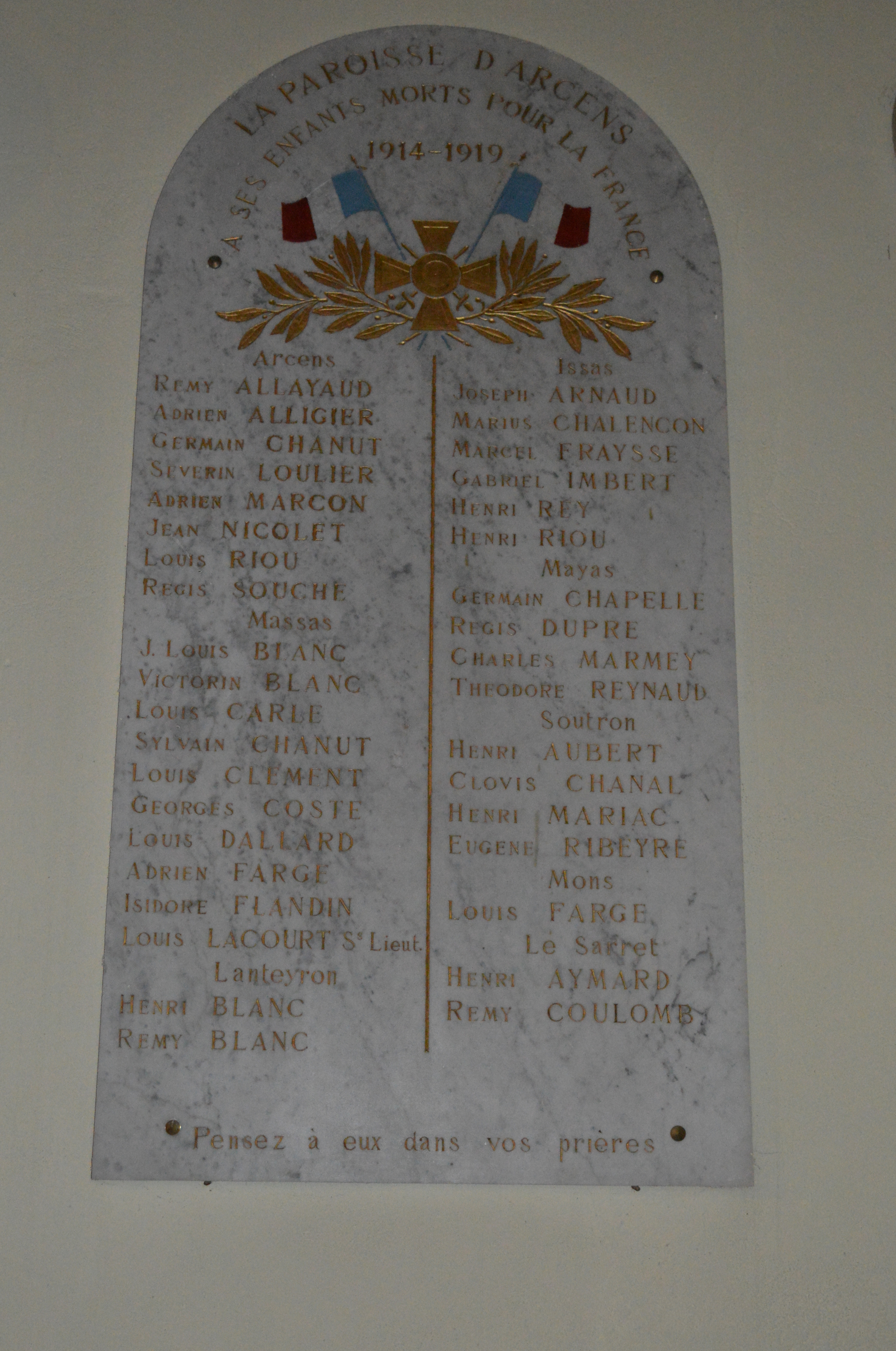
Arcens War Memorial

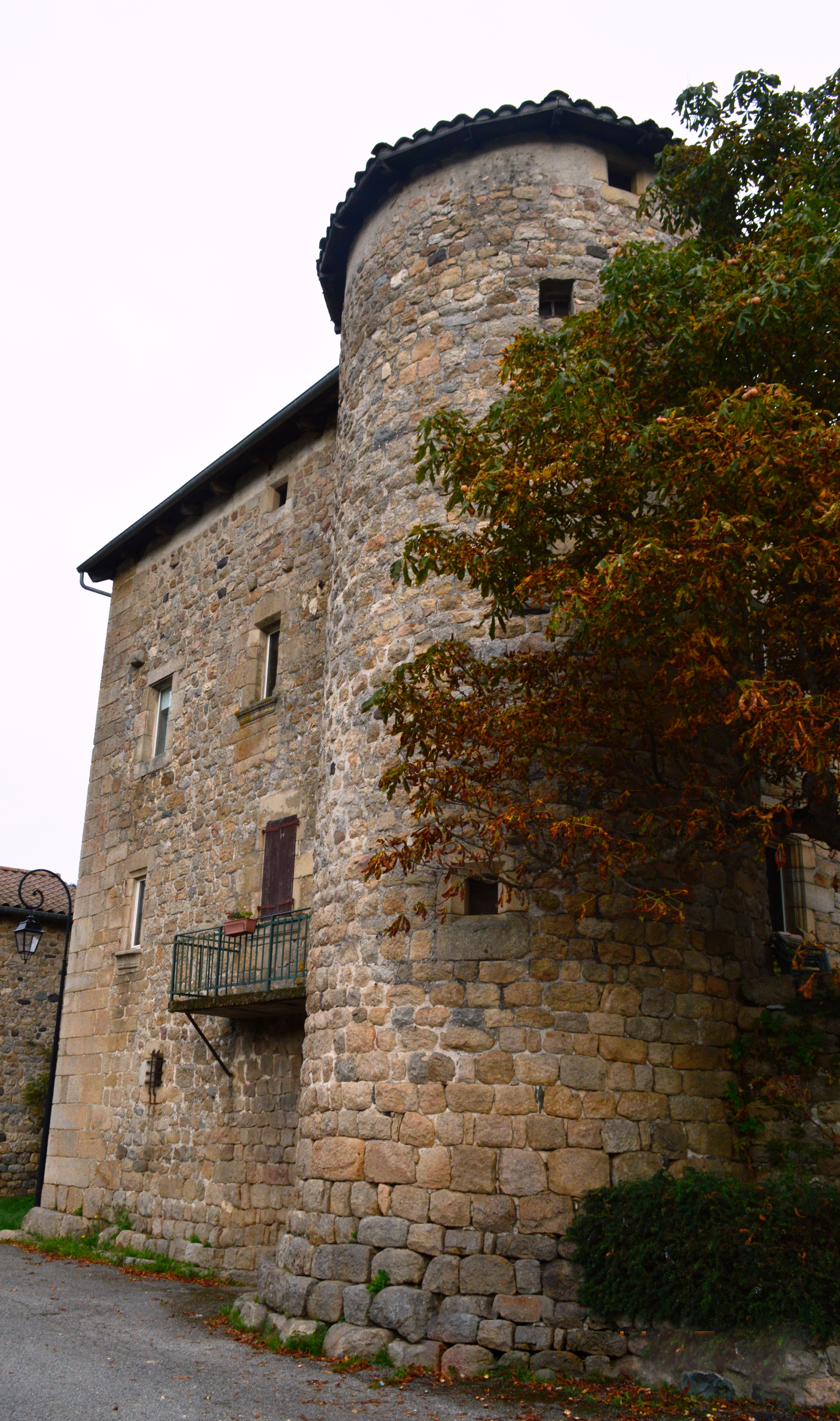
Arcens Chateau

== Sites and Monuments ==
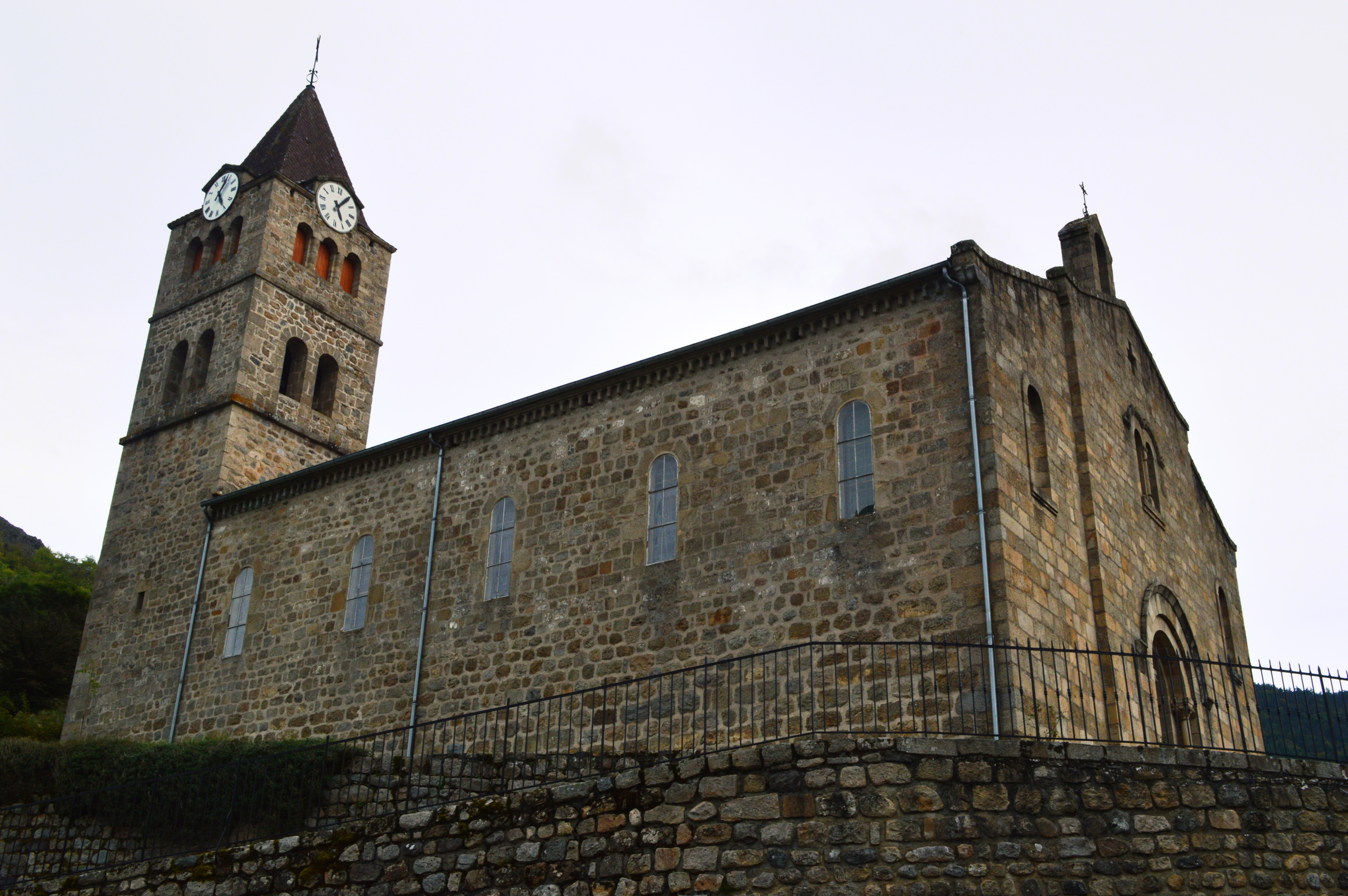
Arcens Church

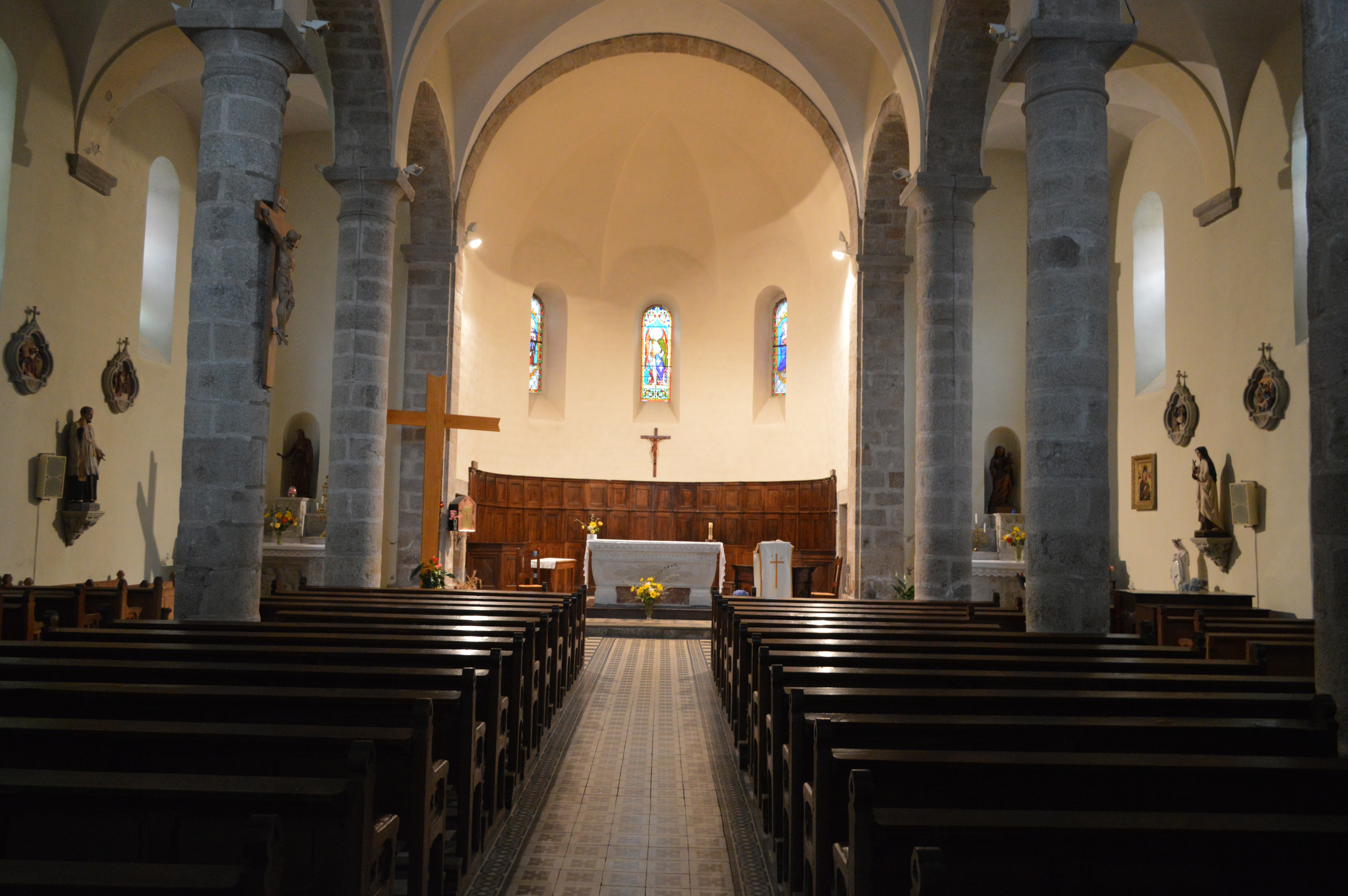
The Church Interior

- Source of gaseous mineral water.
- A Chateau from the 16th century.
- A Church from the 19th century.

== Notable people linked to the commune ==
- Rémy Roure, resistance fighter, editor-in-chief of Le Monde, founder of the Democratic Party then the UDSR.
- Rene Baumer (1906-1982), painter, resistance fighter and deportee. Wrote two novels about Soutron.

== See also ==
- Communes of the Ardèche department
