= Arrondissement of Tournon-sur-Rhône =

Coordinates: 45°03′53″N 4°50′13″E

Tournon-sur-Rhône
- Arrondissement
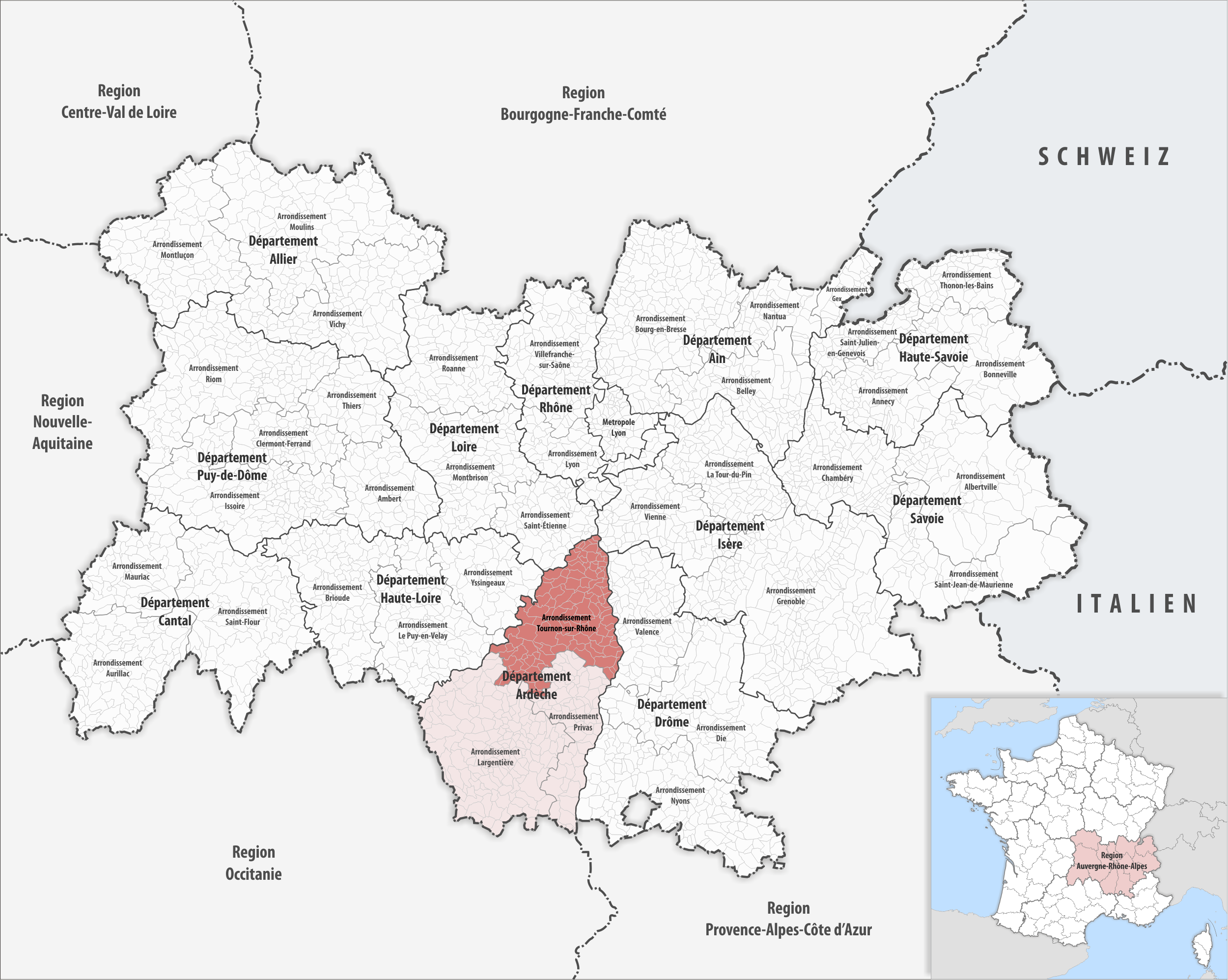
- Location within the region Auvergne-Rhône-Alpes
- Country: France
- Region: Auvergne-Rhône-Alpes
- Department: Ardèche
- No. of communes: {{{nbcomm}}}
- Area: 1,736.8 km^{2} (670.6 sq mi)
- Population (2023): 143,055
  - Density: 82.367/km^{2} (213.33/sq mi)
- INSEE code: 073

The arrondissement of Tournon-sur-Rhône is an arrondissement of France in the Ardèche department in the Auvergne-Rhône-Alpes region. It has 118 communes. Its population is 141,549 (2021), and its area is 1,736.8 km^{2} (670.6 sq mi).

== Composition ==
The communes of the arrondissement of Tournon-sur-Rhône, and their INSEE codes, are:

1. Accons (07001)
2. Albon-d'Ardèche
3. Alboussière (07007)
4. Andance (07009)
5. Annonay (07010)
6. Arcens (07012)
7. Ardoix (07013)
8. Arlebosc (07014)
9. Arras-sur-Rhône (07015)
10. Belsentes (07165)
11. Boffres (07035)
12. Bogy (07036)
13. Boucieu-le-Roi (07040)
14. Boulieu-lès-Annonay (07041)
15. Bozas (07039)
16. Brossainc (07044)
17. Le Chambon (07049)
18. Champagne (07051)
19. Champis (07052)
20. Chanéac (07054)
21. Charmes-sur-Rhône
22. Charnas (07056)
23. Châteaubourg (07059)
24. Cheminas (07063)
25. Le Cheylard (07064)
26. Colombier-le-Cardinal (07067)
27. Colombier-le-Jeune (07068)
28. Colombier-le-Vieux (07069)
29. Cornas (07070)
30. Le Crestet (07073)
31. Davézieux (07078)
32. Désaignes (07079)
33. Devesset (07080)
34. Dornas (07082)
35. Eclassan (07084)
36. Empurany (07085)
37. Étables (07086)
38. Félines (07089)
39. Gilhoc-sur-Ormèze (07095)
40. Glun (07097)
41. Guilherand-Granges (07102)
42. Issamoulenc
43. Jaunac (07108)
44. Labatie-d'Andaure (07114)
45. Lachapelle-sous-Chanéac (07123)
46. Lafarre (07124)
47. Lalouvesc (07128)
48. Lamastre (07129)
49. Lemps (07140)
50. Limony (07143)
51. Mariac (07150)
52. Mars (07151)
53. Mauves (07152)
54. Monestier (07160)
55. Nozières (07166)
56. Ozon (07169)
57. Pailharès (07170)
58. Peaugres (07172)
59. Peyraud (07174)
60. Plats (07177)
61. Préaux (07185)
62. Quintenas (07188)
63. Rochepaule (07192)
64. Roiffieux (07197)
65. Saint-Agrève (07204)
66. Saint-Alban-d'Ay (07205)
67. Saint-Andéol-de-Fourchades (07209)
68. Saint-André-en-Vivarais (07212)
69. Saint-Barthélemy-Grozon (07216)
70. Saint-Barthélemy-le-Meil (07215)
71. Saint-Barthélemy-le-Plain (07217)
72. Saint-Basile (07218)
73. Saint-Christol (07220)
74. Saint-Cierge-sous-le-Cheylard (07222)
75. Saint-Clair (07225)
76. Saint-Clément (07226)
77. Saint-Cyr (07227)
78. Saint-Désirat (07228)
79. Saint-Étienne-de-Valoux (07234)
80. Saint-Félicien (07236)
81. Saint-Genest-Lachamp (07239)
82. Saint-Georges-les-Bains
83. Saint-Jacques-d'Atticieux (07243)
84. Saint-Jean-de-Muzols (07245)
85. Saint-Jean-Roure (07248)
86. Saint-Jeure-d'Andaure (07249)
87. Saint-Jeure-d'Ay (07250)
88. Saint-Julien-d'Intres (07103)
89. Saint-Julien-Vocance (07258)
90. Saint-Marcel-lès-Annonay (07265)
91. Saint-Martin-de-Valamas (07269)
92. Saint-Michel-d'Aurance (07276)
93. Saint-Péray (07281)
94. Saint-Pierre-sur-Doux (07285)
95. Saint-Pierreville
96. Saint-Prix (07290)
97. Saint-Romain-d'Ay (07292)
98. Saint-Romain-de-Lerps (07293)
99. Saint-Sylvestre (07297)
100. Saint-Symphorien-de-Mahun (07299)
101. Saint-Victor (07301)
102. Sarras (07308)
103. Satillieu (07309)
104. Savas (07310)
105. Sécheras (07312)
106. Serrières (07313)
107. Soyons (07316)
108. Talencieux (07317)
109. Thorrenc (07321)
110. Toulaud (07323)
111. Tournon-sur-Rhône (07324)
112. Vanosc (07333)
113. Vaudevant (07335)
114. Vernosc-lès-Annonay (07337)
115. Villevocance (07342)
116. Vinzieux (07344)
117. Vion (07345)
118. Vocance (07347)

== History ==
The arrondissement of Tournon-sur-Rhône was created in 1800. At the January 2017 reorganization of the arrondissements of Ardèche, it gained five communes from the arrondissement of Privas and it lost three communes to the arrondissement of Largentière and eight communes to the arrondissement of Privas.

As a result of the reorganisation of the cantons of France which came into effect in 2015, the borders of the cantons are no longer related to the borders of the arrondissements. The cantons of the arrondissement of Tournon-sur-Rhône were, as of January 2015:

1. Annonay-Nord
2. Annonay-Sud
3. Le Cheylard
4. Lamastre
5. Saint-Agrève
6. Saint-Félicien
7. Saint-Martin-de-Valamas
8. Saint-Péray
9. Satillieu
10. Serrières
11. Tournon-sur-Rhône
12. Vernoux-en-Vivarais
