= Saint-Cierge-sous-le-Cheylard =

- Commune
- Location of Saint-Cierge-sous-le-Cheylard
- Location within France Location within Auvergne-Rhône-Alpes
- Coordinates: 44°55′25″N 4°26′52″E
- Country: France
- Region: Auvergne-Rhône-Alpes
- Department: Ardèche
- Arrondissement: Tournon-sur-Rhône
- Canton: Haut-Eyrieux

Government
  - Mayor (2020–2026): Maurice Saniel
- Area^{1}: 5.99 km^{2} (2.31 sq mi)
- Elevation: 660 m (2,170 ft)
- Highest elevation: 967 m (3,173 ft)
- Lowest elevation: 390 m (1,280 ft)
- Population (2023): 214
  - Density: 35.7/km^{2} (92.5/sq mi)
- Time zone: UTC+01:00 (CET)
  - Summer (DST): UTC+02:00 (CEST)
- INSEE/Postal code: 07222 /07160
- ^{1} French Land Register data, which excludes lakes, ponds, glaciers > 1 km^{2} (0.386 sq mi or 247 acres) and river estuaries.

Saint-Cierge-sous-le-Cheylard (French pronunciation: [sɛ̃ sjɛʁʒ su lə ʃelaʁ] literally Saint-Cierge under Le Cheylard; Occitan: Sant Ciri de Chailar) is a commune in the Ardèche department in southern France.

== Population ==
Historical population
Year	Pop.	±% p.a.
1968	186	—
1975	149	−3.12%
1982	156	+0.66%
1990	167	+0.86%
1999	211	+2.63%
2007	202	−0.54%
2012	192	−1.01%
2017	203	+1.12%
2023	214	+0.88%
Source: INSEE

== See also ==
- Communes of the Ardèche department
