= Lachapelle-sous-Chanéac =

- Commune
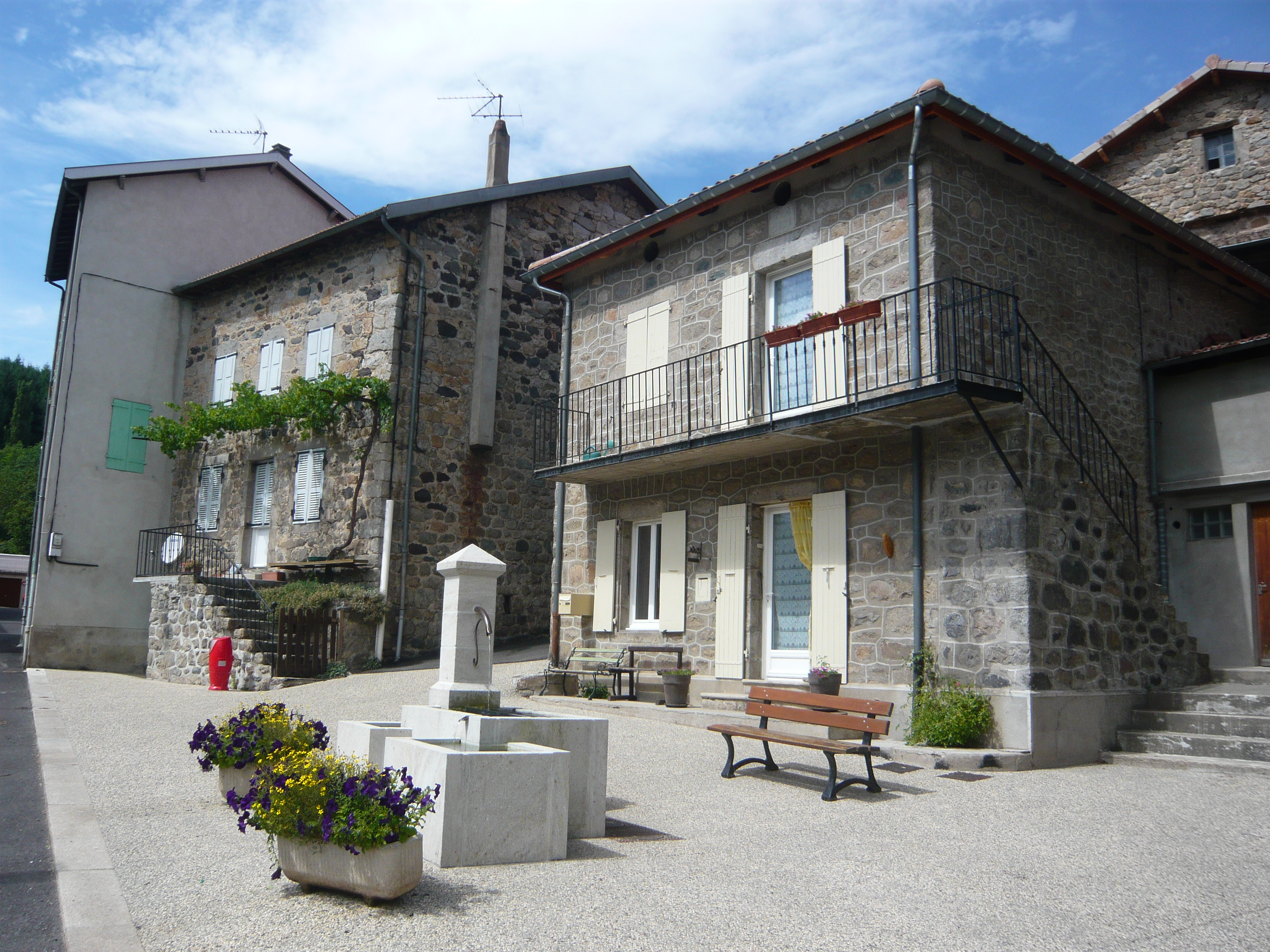
- The centre of the village
- Location of Lachapelle-sous-Chanéac
- Location within France Location within Auvergne-Rhône-Alpes
- Coordinates: 44°56′53″N 4°19′54″E
- Country: France
- Region: Auvergne-Rhône-Alpes
- Department: Ardèche
- Arrondissement: Tournon-sur-Rhône
- Canton: Haut-Eyrieux

Government
  - Mayor (2024–2026): Didier Volle
- Area^{1}: 8.94 km^{2} (3.45 sq mi)
- Elevation: 600 m (2,000 ft)
- Highest elevation: 1,121 m (3,678 ft)
- Lowest elevation: 594 m (1,949 ft)
- Population (2023): 158
  - Density: 17.7/km^{2} (45.8/sq mi)
- Time zone: UTC+01:00 (CET)
  - Summer (DST): UTC+02:00 (CEST)
- INSEE/Postal code: 07123 /07310
- ^{1} French Land Register data, which excludes lakes, ponds, glaciers > 1 km^{2} (0.386 sq mi or 247 acres) and river estuaries.

Lachapelle-sous-Chanéac (French pronunciation: [laʃapɛl su ʃaneak], literally Lachapelle under Chanéac; Occitan: La Chapèla de Chanhac) is a commune in the Ardèche department in southern France.

== Population ==
Historical population
Year	Pop.	±% p.a.
1968	271	—
1975	232	−2.20%
1982	204	−1.82%
1990	162	−2.84%
1999	174	+0.80%
2007	200	+1.76%
2012	176	−2.52%
2017	172	−0.46%
2023	158	−1.41%
Source: INSEE

== See also ==
- Communes of the Ardèche department
