= Dornas =

- Commune
- Location of Dornas
- Location within France Location within Auvergne-Rhône-Alpes
- Coordinates: 44°51′11″N 4°21′14″E
- Country: France
- Region: Auvergne-Rhône-Alpes
- Department: Ardèche
- Arrondissement: Tournon-sur-Rhône
- Canton: Haut-Eyrieux

Government
  - Mayor (2024–2026): Gaëlord Vialle
- Area^{1}: 17.63 km^{2} (6.81 sq mi)
- Elevation: 630 m (2,070 ft)
- Highest elevation: 1,201 m (3,940 ft)
- Lowest elevation: 584 m (1,916 ft)
- Population (2023): 195
  - Density: 11.1/km^{2} (28.6/sq mi)
- Time zone: UTC+01:00 (CET)
  - Summer (DST): UTC+02:00 (CEST)
- INSEE/Postal code: 07082 /07160
- ^{1} French Land Register data, which excludes lakes, ponds, glaciers > 1 km^{2} (0.386 sq mi or 247 acres) and river estuaries.

Dornas is a commune in the Ardèche department in southern France. This village is located 10 km (6 mi) from Le Cheylard, 40 km (25 mi) from Aubenas, and 47 km (29 mi) from Privas.

== Population ==
Historical population
Year	Pop.	±% p.a.
1968	379	—
1975	317	−2.52%
1982	276	−1.96%
1990	269	−0.32%
1999	247	−0.94%
2007	272	+1.21%
2012	264	−0.60%
2017	207	−4.75%
2023	195	−0.99%
Source: INSEE

== See also ==
- Communes of the Ardèche department
