= Jaunac =

- Commune
- Location of Jaunac
- Location within France Location within Auvergne-Rhône-Alpes
- Coordinates: 44°55′13″N 4°24′00″E
- Country: France
- Region: Auvergne-Rhône-Alpes
- Department: Ardèche
- Arrondissement: Tournon-sur-Rhône
- Canton: Haut-Eyrieux

Government
  - Mayor (2023–2026): Alain Clauzier
- Area^{1}: 3.92 km^{2} (1.51 sq mi)
- Elevation: 600 m (2,000 ft)
- Highest elevation: 980 m (3,220 ft)
- Lowest elevation: 440 m (1,440 ft)
- Population (2023): 125
  - Density: 31.9/km^{2} (82.6/sq mi)
- Time zone: UTC+01:00 (CET)
  - Summer (DST): UTC+02:00 (CEST)
- INSEE/Postal code: 07108 /07160
- ^{1} French Land Register data, which excludes lakes, ponds, glaciers > 1 km^{2} (0.386 sq mi or 247 acres) and river estuaries.

Jaunac (French pronunciation: [ʒonak]) is a commune in the Ardèche department in southern France.

== Population ==
Historical population
Year	Pop.	±% p.a.
1968	101	—
1975	103	+0.28%
1982	82	−3.20%
1990	84	+0.30%
1999	107	+2.73%
2007	139	+3.32%
2012	140	+0.14%
2017	127	−1.93%
2023	125	−0.26%
Source: INSEE

== See also ==
- Communes of the Ardèche department
