= Saint-Michel-d'Aurance =

- Commune
- Location of Saint-Michel-d'Aurance
- Location within France Location within Auvergne-Rhône-Alpes
- Coordinates: 44°54′09″N 4°27′41″E
- Country: France
- Region: Auvergne-Rhône-Alpes
- Department: Ardèche
- Arrondissement: Tournon-sur-Rhône
- Canton: Haut-Eyrieux

Government
  - Mayor (2020–2026): Dorian Rey
- Area^{1}: 8.14 km^{2} (3.14 sq mi)
- Elevation: 602 m (1,975 ft)
- Highest elevation: 922 m (3,025 ft)
- Lowest elevation: 370 m (1,210 ft)
- Population (2023): 262
  - Density: 32.2/km^{2} (83.4/sq mi)
- Time zone: UTC+01:00 (CET)
  - Summer (DST): UTC+02:00 (CEST)
- INSEE/Postal code: 07276 /07160
- ^{1} French Land Register data, which excludes lakes, ponds, glaciers > 1 km^{2} (0.386 sq mi or 247 acres) and river estuaries.

Saint-Michel-d'Aurance (French pronunciation: [sɛ̃ miʃɛl doʁɑ̃s]; Occitan: Sant Michel d'Aurance) is a commune in the Ardèche department in southern France.

== Population ==
Historical population
Year	Pop.	±% p.a.
1968	218	—
1975	155	−4.76%
1982	163	+0.72%
1990	185	+1.60%
1999	222	+2.05%
2007	233	+0.61%
2012	268	+2.84%
2017	274	+0.44%
2023	262	−0.74%
Source: INSEE

== See also ==
- Communes of the Ardèche department
