= Saint-Christol, Ardèche =

Saint-Christol
- Commune
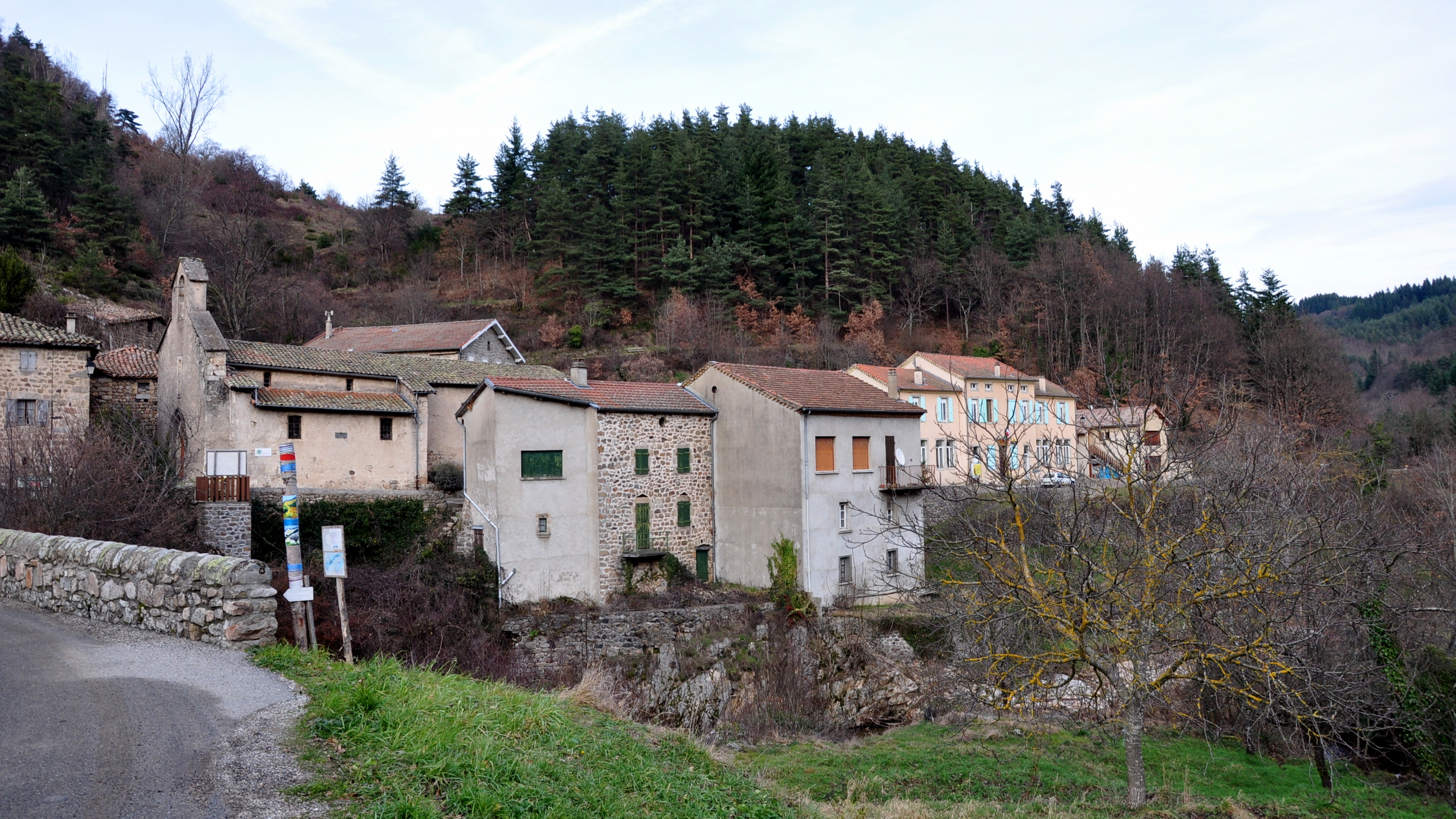
- Location of Saint-Christol
- Location within France Location within Auvergne-Rhône-Alpes
- Coordinates: 44°52′07″N 4°26′30″E
- Country: France
- Region: Auvergne-Rhône-Alpes
- Department: Ardèche
- Arrondissement: Tournon-sur-Rhône
- Canton: Haut-Eyrieux

Government
  - Mayor (2020–2026): Nicolas Freydier
- Area^{1}: 14.63 km^{2} (5.65 sq mi)
- Elevation: 600 m (2,000 ft)
- Highest elevation: 1,201 m (3,940 ft)
- Lowest elevation: 550 m (1,800 ft)
- Population (2023): 102
  - Density: 6.97/km^{2} (18.1/sq mi)
- Time zone: UTC+01:00 (CET)
  - Summer (DST): UTC+02:00 (CEST)
- INSEE/Postal code: 07220 /07160
- ^{1} French Land Register data, which excludes lakes, ponds, glaciers > 1 km^{2} (0.386 sq mi or 247 acres) and river estuaries.

Saint-Christol (French pronunciation: [sɛ̃ kʁistɔl]; Occitan: Sant Cristòu) is a commune in the Ardèche department in southern France.

== Population ==
Historical population
Year	Pop.	±% p.a.
1968	216	—
1975	174	−3.04%
1982	145	−2.57%
1990	116	−2.75%
1999	92	−2.54%
2007	103	+1.42%
2012	108	+0.95%
2017	103	−0.94%
2023	102	−0.16%
Source: INSEE

== See also ==
- Communes of the Ardèche department
