= Peyraud =

- Commune
- Coat of arms
- Location of Peyraud
- Location within France Location within Auvergne-Rhône-Alpes
- Coordinates: 45°18′13″N 4°47′19″E
- Country: France
- Region: Auvergne-Rhône-Alpes
- Department: Ardèche
- Arrondissement: Tournon-sur-Rhône
- Canton: Sarras

Government
  - Mayor (2020–2026): André Biennier
- Area^{1}: 5.96 km^{2} (2.30 sq mi)
- Elevation: 141 m (463 ft)
- Highest elevation: 381 m (1,250 ft)
- Lowest elevation: 134 m (440 ft)
- Population (2023): 516
  - Density: 86.6/km^{2} (224/sq mi)
- Time zone: UTC+01:00 (CET)
  - Summer (DST): UTC+02:00 (CEST)
- INSEE/Postal code: 07174 /07340
- ^{1} French Land Register data, which excludes lakes, ponds, glaciers > 1 km^{2} (0.386 sq mi or 247 acres) and river estuaries.

Peyraud (French pronunciation: [peʁo]; Arpitan: Piérrôd) is a commune in the Ardèche department in southern France.

== Population ==
Historical population
Year	Pop.	±% p.a.
1968	416	—
1975	423	+0.24%
1982	422	−0.03%
1990	449	+0.78%
1999	451	+0.05%
2007	504	+1.40%
2012	531	+1.05%
2017	495	−1.39%
2023	516	+0.69%
Source: INSEE

== See also ==
- Communes of the Ardèche department
