= Saint-Jean-Roure =

- Commune
- Location of Saint-Jean-Roure
- Location within France Location within Auvergne-Rhône-Alpes
- Coordinates: 44°56′34″N 4°25′48″E
- Country: France
- Region: Auvergne-Rhône-Alpes
- Department: Ardèche
- Arrondissement: Tournon-sur-Rhône
- Canton: Haut-Eyrieux

Government
  - Mayor (2022–2026): Gérard Saniel
- Area^{1}: 23.99 km^{2} (9.26 sq mi)
- Elevation: 950 m (3,120 ft)
- Highest elevation: 1,132 m (3,714 ft)
- Lowest elevation: 470 m (1,540 ft)
- Population (2023): 275
  - Density: 11.5/km^{2} (29.7/sq mi)
- Time zone: UTC+01:00 (CET)
  - Summer (DST): UTC+02:00 (CEST)
- INSEE/Postal code: 07248 /07160
- ^{1} French Land Register data, which excludes lakes, ponds, glaciers > 1 km^{2} (0.386 sq mi or 247 acres) and river estuaries.

Saint-Jean-Roure (French pronunciation: [sɛ̃ ʒɑ̃ ʁuʁ]; Occitan: Sant Joan dau Rore) is a commune in the Ardèche department in southern France.

== Population ==
Historical population
Year	Pop.	±% p.a.
1968	277	—
1975	232	−2.50%
1982	218	−0.89%
1990	202	−0.95%
1999	206	+0.22%
2007	253	+2.60%
2012	279	+1.98%
2017	258	−1.55%
2023	275	+1.07%
Source: INSEE

== See also ==
- Communes of the Ardèche department
