= Saint-Jeure-d'Andaure =

- Commune
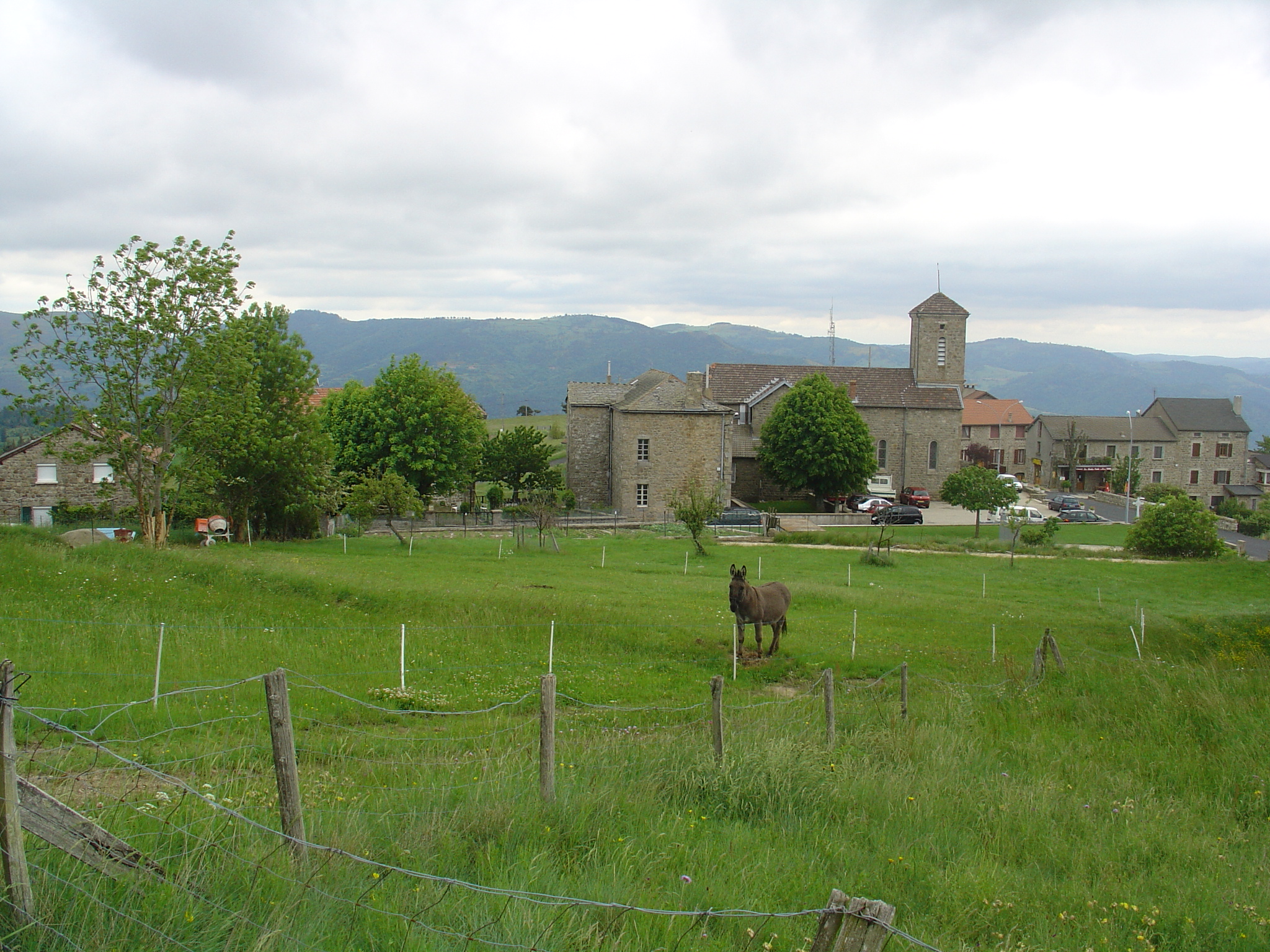
- The church and surrounding buildings in Saint-Jeure-d'Andaure
- Location of Saint-Jeure-d'Andaure
- Location within France Location within Auvergne-Rhône-Alpes
- Coordinates: 45°02′50″N 4°27′32″E
- Country: France
- Region: Auvergne-Rhône-Alpes
- Department: Ardèche
- Arrondissement: Tournon-sur-Rhône
- Canton: Haut-Eyrieux

Government
  - Mayor (2020–2026): Aline Dubouis
- Area^{1}: 13.28 km^{2} (5.13 sq mi)
- Elevation: 960 m (3,150 ft)
- Highest elevation: 1,124 m (3,688 ft)
- Lowest elevation: 528 m (1,732 ft)
- Population (2023): 104
  - Density: 7.83/km^{2} (20.3/sq mi)
- Time zone: UTC+01:00 (CET)
  - Summer (DST): UTC+02:00 (CEST)
- INSEE/Postal code: 07249 /07320
- ^{1} French Land Register data, which excludes lakes, ponds, glaciers > 1 km^{2} (0.386 sq mi or 247 acres) and river estuaries.

Saint-Jeure-d'Andaure (French pronunciation: [sɛ̃ ʒœʁ dɑ̃doʁ]; Occitan: Sant Jeure d'Andaure) is a commune in the Ardèche department in southern France.

== Population ==
Historical population
Year	Pop.	±% p.a.
1968	234	—
1975	176	−3.99%
1982	143	−2.92%
1990	94	−5.11%
1999	96	+0.23%
2007	93	−0.40%
2012	106	+2.65%
2017	102	−0.77%
2023	104	+0.32%
Source: INSEE

== See also ==
- Communes of the Ardèche department
