= La Rochette, Ardèche =

La Rochette
- Commune
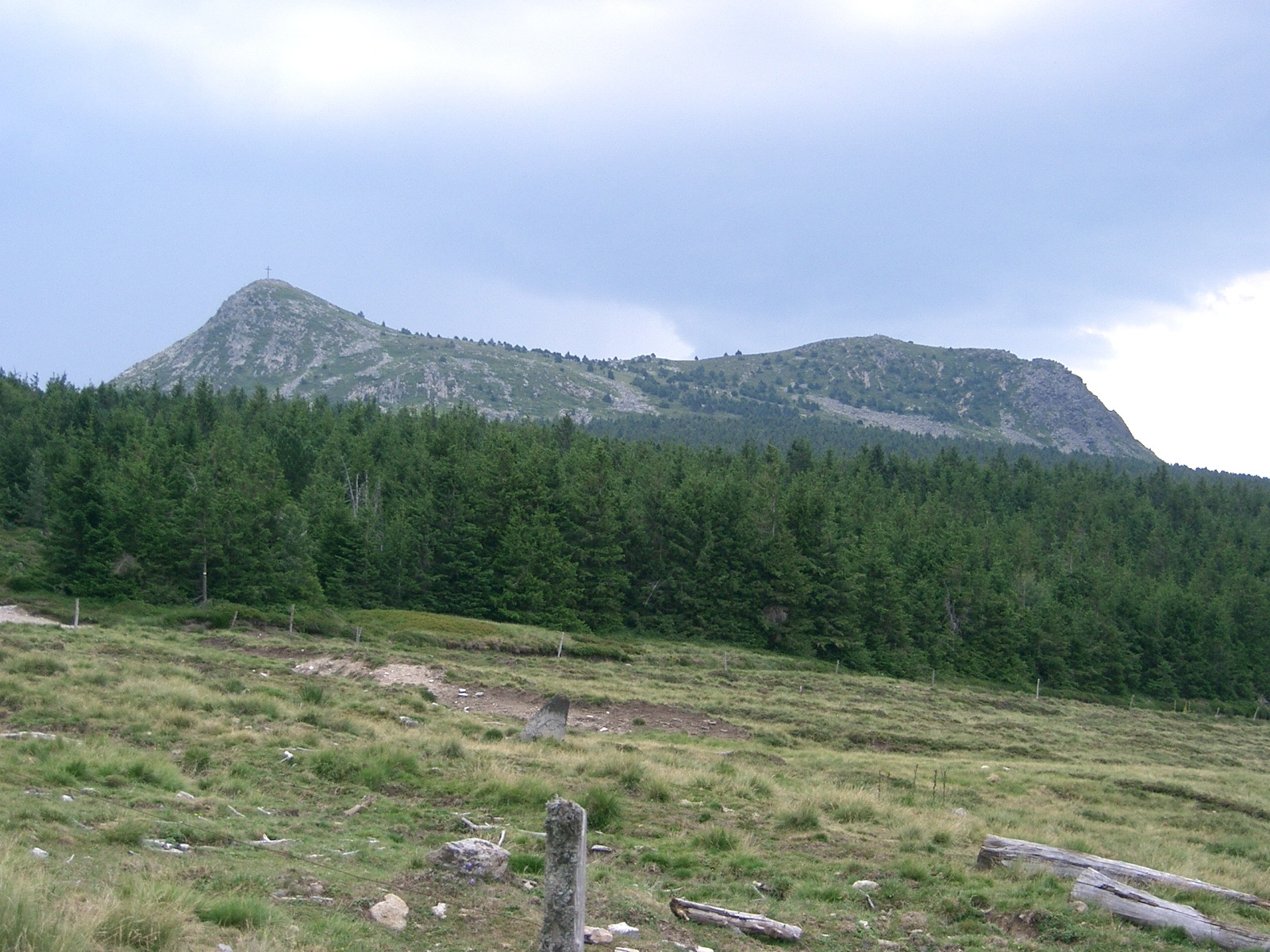
- Mont Mézenc seen from La Rochette
- Location of La Rochette
- Location within France Location within Auvergne-Rhône-Alpes
- Coordinates: 44°55′01″N 4°14′30″E
- Country: France
- Region: Auvergne-Rhône-Alpes
- Department: Ardèche
- Arrondissement: Largentière
- Canton: Haut-Eyrieux

Government
  - Mayor (2020–2026): Serge Charpenay
- Area^{1}: 13.86 km^{2} (5.35 sq mi)
- Elevation: 930 m (3,050 ft)
- Highest elevation: 1,726 m (5,663 ft)
- Lowest elevation: 787 m (2,582 ft)
- Population (2023): 63
  - Density: 4.5/km^{2} (12/sq mi)
- Time zone: UTC+01:00 (CET)
  - Summer (DST): UTC+02:00 (CEST)
- INSEE/Postal code: 07195 /07310
- ^{1} French Land Register data, which excludes lakes, ponds, glaciers > 1 km^{2} (0.386 sq mi or 247 acres) and river estuaries.

La Rochette (French pronunciation: [la ʁɔʃɛt]; Occitan: La Rocheta) is a commune in the Ardèche department in southern France.

== Population ==
Historical population
Year	Pop.	±% p.a.
1968	169	—
1975	124	−4.33%
1982	110	−1.70%
1990	64	−6.55%
1999	57	−1.28%
2007	62	+1.06%
2012	58	−1.32%
2017	59	+0.34%
2023	63	+1.10%
Source: INSEE

== See also ==
- Communes of the Ardèche department
