= Devesset =

- Commune
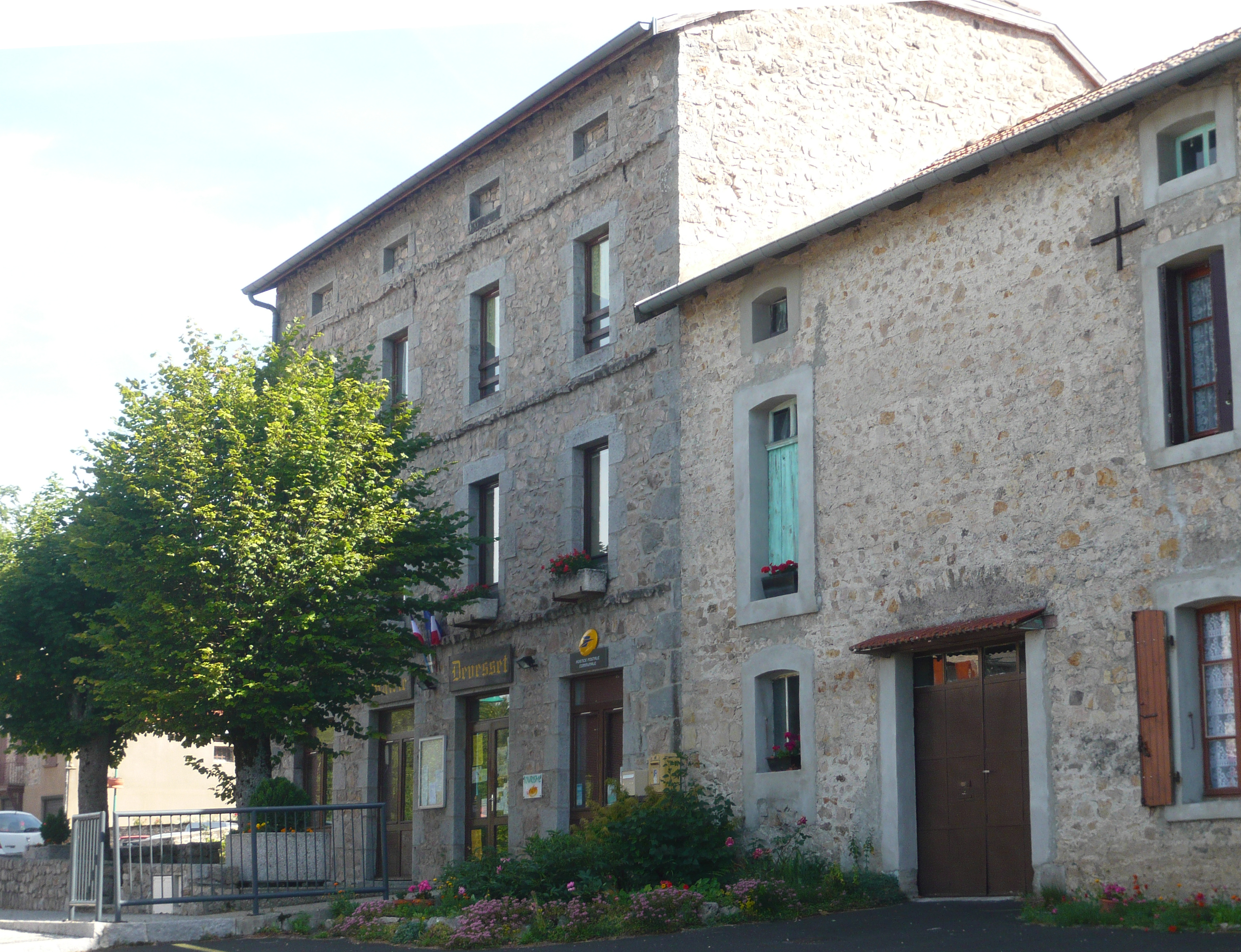
- Town hall
- Location of Devesset
- Location within France Location within Auvergne-Rhône-Alpes
- Coordinates: 45°04′05″N 4°23′21″E
- Country: France
- Region: Auvergne-Rhône-Alpes
- Department: Ardèche
- Arrondissement: Tournon-sur-Rhône
- Canton: Haut-Eyrieux

Government
  - Mayor (2020–2026): Etienne Roche
- Area^{1}: 29.24 km^{2} (11.29 sq mi)
- Elevation: 1,100 m (3,600 ft)
- Highest elevation: 1,212 m (3,976 ft)
- Lowest elevation: 669 m (2,195 ft)
- Population (2023): 310
  - Density: 11/km^{2} (27/sq mi)
- Time zone: UTC+01:00 (CET)
  - Summer (DST): UTC+02:00 (CEST)
- INSEE/Postal code: 07080 /07320
- ^{1} French Land Register data, which excludes lakes, ponds, glaciers > 1 km^{2} (0.386 sq mi or 247 acres) and river estuaries.

Devesset (French pronunciation: [dəvɛsɛ]) is a commune in the Ardèche department in southern France.

== Population ==
Historical population
Year	Pop.	±% p.a.
1968	462	—
1975	281	−6.86%
1982	270	−0.57%
1990	267	−0.14%
1999	271	+0.17%
2007	294	+1.02%
2012	287	−0.48%
2017	295	+0.55%
2023	310	+0.83%
Source: INSEE

== See also ==
- Communes of the Ardèche department
