= Borée =

- Commune
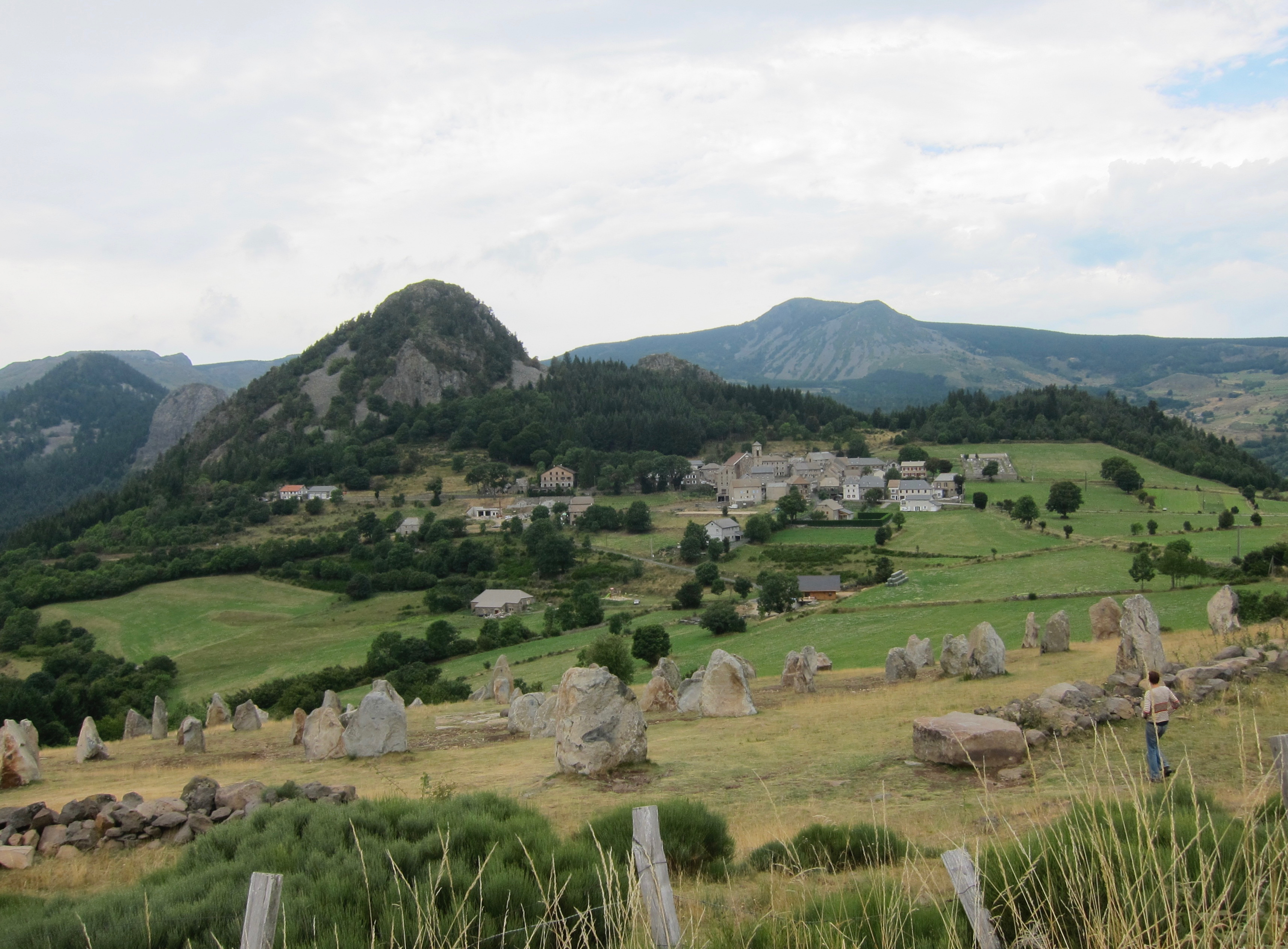
- A general view of Borée
- Location of Borée
- Location within France Location within Auvergne-Rhône-Alpes
- Coordinates: 44°53′57″N 4°14′26″E
- Country: France
- Region: Auvergne-Rhône-Alpes
- Department: Ardèche
- Arrondissement: Largentière
- Canton: Haut-Eyrieux

Government
  - Mayor (2020–2026): Anne-Marie Marion
- Area^{1}: 27.67 km^{2} (10.68 sq mi)
- Highest elevation: 1,747 m (5,732 ft)
- Lowest elevation: 807 m (2,648 ft)
- Population (2023): 135
  - Density: 4.88/km^{2} (12.6/sq mi)
- Time zone: UTC+01:00 (CET)
  - Summer (DST): UTC+02:00 (CEST)
- INSEE/Postal code: 07037 /07310
- ^{1} French Land Register data, which excludes lakes, ponds, glaciers > 1 km^{2} (0.386 sq mi or 247 acres) and river estuaries.

Borée (French pronunciation: [bɔʁe]; Occitan: Borèia) is a commune in the Ardèche department in the Auvergne-Rhône-Alpes region in southern France.

== See also ==
- Communes of the Ardèche department
