= Saint-Genest-Lachamp =

- Commune
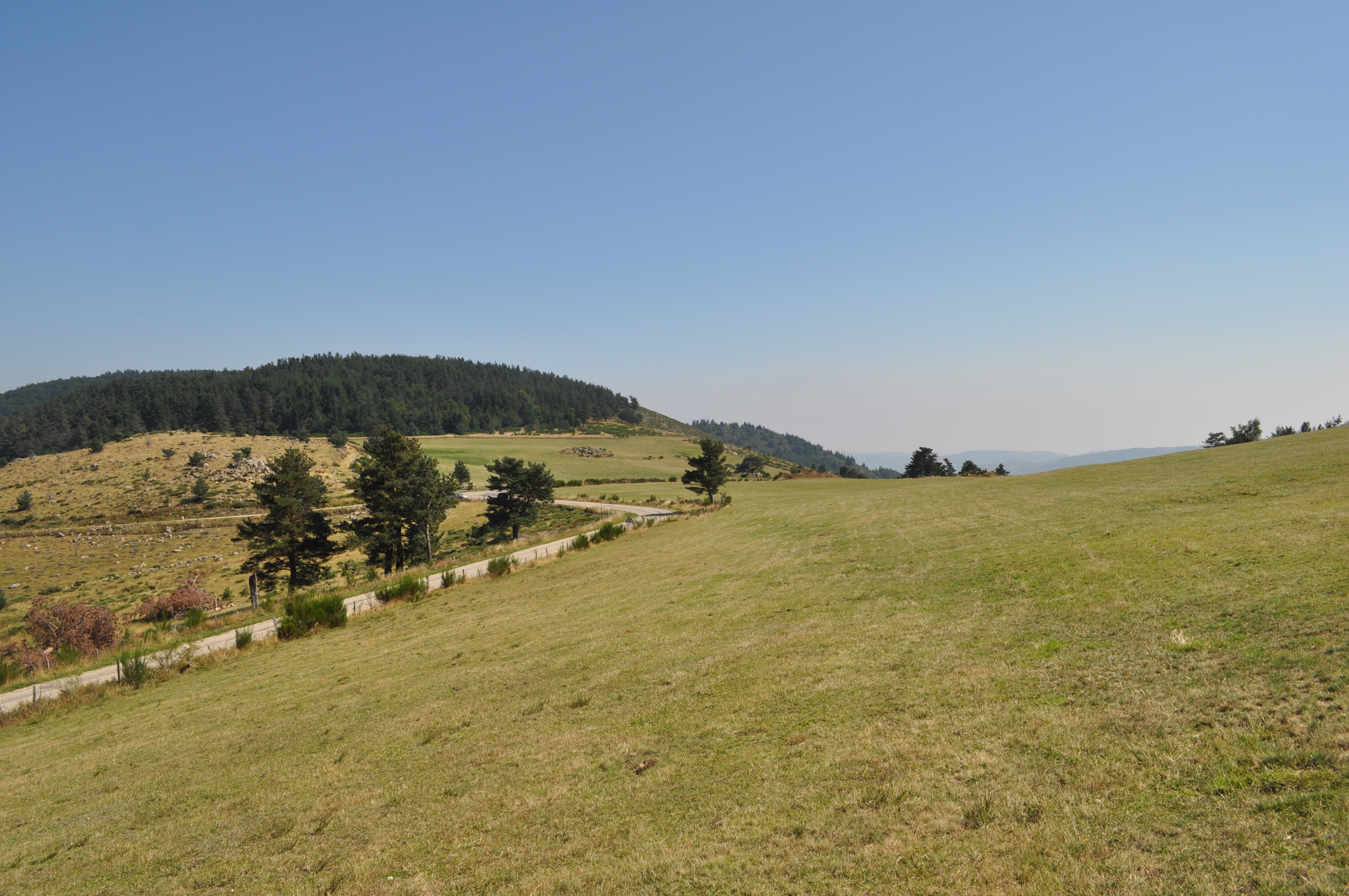
- The Col de la Faye
- Location of Saint-Genest-Lachamp
- Location within France Location within Auvergne-Rhône-Alpes
- Coordinates: 44°50′52″N 4°25′28″E
- Country: France
- Region: Auvergne-Rhône-Alpes
- Department: Ardèche
- Arrondissement: Tournon-sur-Rhône
- Canton: Haut-Eyrieux

Government
  - Mayor (2022–2026): Sonia Mercury
- Area^{1}: 23.09 km^{2} (8.92 sq mi)
- Elevation: 1,000 m (3,300 ft)
- Highest elevation: 1,133 m (3,717 ft)
- Lowest elevation: 560 m (1,840 ft)
- Population (2023): 112
  - Density: 4.85/km^{2} (12.6/sq mi)
- Time zone: UTC+01:00 (CET)
  - Summer (DST): UTC+02:00 (CEST)
- INSEE/Postal code: 07239 /07190
- ^{1} French Land Register data, which excludes lakes, ponds, glaciers > 1 km^{2} (0.386 sq mi or 247 acres) and river estuaries.

Saint-Genest-Lachamp (Occitan: Sant Genèst de Champlen) is a commune in the Ardèche department in southern France.

== Population ==
Historical population
Year	Pop.	±% p.a.
1968	214	—
1975	167	−3.48%
1982	156	−0.97%
1990	132	−2.07%
1999	104	−2.61%
2007	101	−0.37%
2012	101	+0.00%
2017	104	+0.59%
2023	112	+1.24%
Source: INSEE

== See also ==
- Communes of the Ardèche department
