= Communes of the Ardèche department =

The following is a list of the 335 communes of the Ardèche department of France.

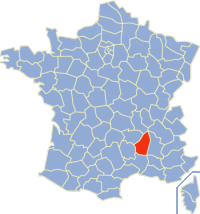

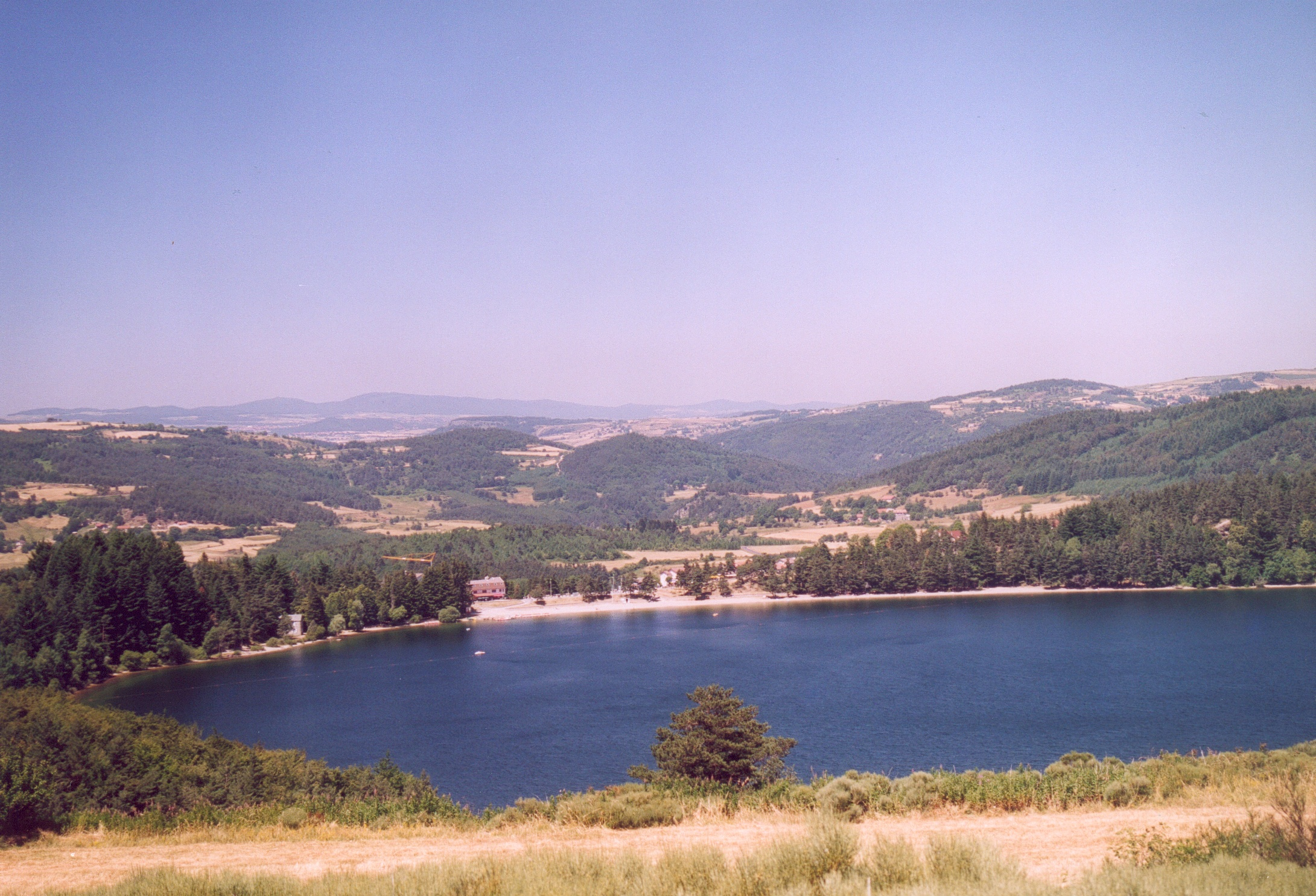

The communes cooperate in the following intercommunalities (as of 2025):

- Communauté d'agglomération Annonay Rhône Agglo
- Communauté d'agglomération Arche Agglo (partly)
- Communauté d'agglomération Privas Centre Ardèche
- Communauté de communes Ardèche des Sources et Volcans
- Communauté de communes Ardèche Rhône Coiron
- Communauté de communes du Bassin d'Aubenas
- Communauté de communes Berg et Coiron
- Communauté de communes Cèze-Cévennes (partly)
- Communauté de communes des Gorges de l'Ardèche
- Communauté de communes de la Montagne d'Ardèche
- Communauté de communes du Pays Beaume-Drobie
- Communauté de communes du Pays de Lamastre
- Communauté de communes Pays des Vans en Cévennes
- Communauté de communes Porte de DrômArdèche (partly)
- Communauté de communes du Rhône aux Gorges de l'Ardèche
- Communauté de communes Rhône Crussol
- Communauté de communes Source de l'Ardèche
- Communauté de communes du Val d'Ay
- Communauté de communes Val'Eyrieux
- Communauté de communes Val de Ligne

INSEE	Postal	Commune
07001	07160	Accons
07002	07200	Ailhon
07003	07530	Aizac
07004	07000	Ajoux
07005	07400	Alba-la-Romaine
07006	07190	Albon-d'Ardèche
07007	07440	Alboussière
07008	07210	Alissas
07009	07340	Andance
07010	07100	Annonay
07012	07310	Arcens
07013	07290	Ardoix
07014	07410	Arlebosc
07015	07370	Arras-sur-Rhône
07017	07140	Les Assions
07018	07330	Astet
07019	07200	Aubenas
07020	07400	Aubignas
07022	07210	Baix
07023	07120	Balazuc
07024	07460	Banne
07025	07330	Barnas
07026	07630	Le Béage
07027	07800	Beauchastel
07028	07460	Beaulieu
07029	07110	Beaumont
07030	07190	Beauvène
07165	07160	Belsentes
07031	07460	Berrias-et-Casteljau
07032	07580	Berzème
07033	07150	Bessas
07034	07700	Bidon
07035	07440	Boffres
07036	07340	Bogy
07037	07310	Borée
07038	07590	Borne
07040	07270	Boucieu-le-Roi
07041	07100	Boulieu-lès-Annonay
07042	07700	Bourg-Saint-Andéol
07039	07410	Bozas
07044	07340	Brossainc
07045	07450	Burzet
07047	07590	Cellier-du-Luc
07048	07240	Chalencon
07049	07160	Le Chambon
07050	07140	Chambonas
07051	07340	Champagne
07052	07440	Champis
07053	07230	Chandolas
07054	07310	Chanéac
07055	07800	Charmes-sur-Rhône
07056	07340	Charnas
07058	07110	Chassiers
07059	07130	Châteaubourg
07060	07240	Châteauneuf-de-Vernoux
07061	07120	Chauzon
07062	07110	Chazeaux
07063	07300	Cheminas
07064	07160	Le Cheylard
07065	07380	Chirols
07066	07210	Chomérac
07067	07430	Colombier-le-Cardinal
07068	07270	Colombier-le-Jeune
07069	07410	Colombier-le-Vieux
07070	07130	Cornas
07071	07470	Coucouron
07072	07000	Coux
07073	07270	Le Crestet
07074	07000	Creysseilles
07075	07510	Cros-de-Géorand
07076	07350	Cruas
07077	07170	Darbres
07078	07430	Davézieux
07079	07570	Désaignes
07080	07320	Devesset
07081	07260	Dompnac
07082	07160	Dornas
07083	07360	Dunière-sur-Eyrieux
07084	07370	Eclassan
07085	07270	Empurany
07086	07300	Étables
07087	07380	Fabras
07088	07230	Faugères
07089	07340	Félines
07090	07000	Flaviac
07091	07200	Fons
07092	07000	Freyssenet
07093	07530	Genestelle
07094	07800	Gilhac-et-Bruzac
07095	07270	Gilhoc-sur-Ormèze
07096	07190	Gluiras
07097	07300	Glun
07098	07000	Gourdon
07099	07700	Gras
07100	07140	Gravières
07101	07120	Grospierres
07102	07500	Guilherand-Granges
07104	07190	Issamoulenc
07105	07510	Issanlas
07106	07470	Issarlès
07107	07380	Jaujac
07108	07160	Jaunac
07109	07110	Joannas
07110	07260	Joyeuse
07111	07600	Juvinas
07113	07150	Labastide-de-Virac
07112	07600	Labastide-sur-Bésorgues
07114	07570	Labatie-d'Andaure
07115	07120	Labeaume
07116	07200	Labégude
07117	07230	Lablachère
07118	07110	Laboule
07119	07470	Le Lac-d'Issarlès
07120	07530	Lachamp-Raphaël
07121	07470	Lachapelle-Graillouse
07122	07200	Lachapelle-sous-Aubenas
07123	07310	Lachapelle-sous-Chanéac
07124	07520	Lafarre
07126	07150	Lagorce
07127	07380	Lalevade-d'Ardèche
07128	07520	Lalouvesc
07129	07270	Lamastre
07130	07660	Lanarce
07131	07200	Lanas
07132	07110	Largentière
07133	07220	Larnas
07134	07110	Laurac-en-Vivarais
07136	48250	Laveyrune
07137	07660	Lavillatte
07138	07170	Lavilledieu
07139	07530	Laviolle
07140	07300	Lemps
07141	07200	Lentillères
07142	07660	Lespéron
07143	07340	Limony
07144	07110	Loubaresse
07145	07170	Lussas
07146	07000	Lyas
07147	07140	Malarce-sur-la-Thines
07148	07140	Malbosc
07149	07190	Marcols-les-Eaux
07150	07160	Mariac
07151	07320	Mars
07152	07300	Mauves
07153	07330	Mayres
07154	07510	Mazan-l'Abbaye
07155	07200	Mercuer
07156	07380	Meyras
07157	07400	Meysse
07158	07530	Mézilhac
07159	07170	Mirabel
07160	07690	Monestier
07161	07560	Montpezat-sous-Bauzon
07162	07110	Montréal
07163	07140	Montselgues
07166	07270	Nozières
07167	07360	Les Ollières-sur-Eyrieux
07168	07150	Orgnac-l'Aven
07169	07370	Ozon
07170	07410	Pailharès
07171	07230	Payzac
07172	07340	Peaugres
07173	07450	Péreyres
07174	07340	Peyraud
07175	07590	Le Plagnal
07176	07230	Planzolles

INSEE	Postal	Commune
07177	07300	Plats
07178	07380	Pont-de-Labeaume
07179	07000	Pourchères
07181	07250	Le Pouzin
07182	07380	Prades
07183	07120	Pradons
07184	07000	Pranles
07185	07290	Préaux
07186	07000	Privas
07187	07110	Prunet
07188	07290	Quintenas
07189	07260	Ribes
07190	07200	Rochecolombe
07191	07400	Rochemaure
07192	07320	Rochepaule
07193	07110	Rocher
07194	07210	Rochessauve
07195	07310	La Rochette
07196	07110	Rocles
07197	07100	Roiffieux
07198	07250	Rompon
07199	07260	Rosières
07200	07560	Le Roux
07201	07120	Ruoms
07202	07260	Sablières
07203	07450	Sagnes-et-Goudoulet
07204	07320	Saint-Agrève
07207	07120	Saint-Alban-Auriolles
07205	07790	Saint-Alban-d'Ay
07206	07590	Saint-Alban-en-Montagne
07208	07170	Saint-Andéol-de-Berg
07209	07160	Saint-Andéol-de-Fourchades
07210	07600	Saint-Andéol-de-Vals
07211	07460	Saint-André-de-Cruzières
07212	07690	Saint-André-en-Vivarais
07213	07230	Saint-André-Lachamp
07214	07240	Saint-Apollinaire-de-Rias
07216	07270	Saint-Barthélemy-Grozon
07215	07160	Saint-Barthélemy-le-Meil
07217	07300	Saint-Barthélemy-le-Plain
07218	07270	Saint-Basile
07219	07210	Saint-Bauzile
07220	07160	Saint-Christol
07221	07800	Saint-Cierge-la-Serre
07222	07160	Saint-Cierge-sous-le-Cheylard
07223	07380	Saint-Cirgues-de-Prades
07224	07510	Saint-Cirgues-en-Montagne
07225	07430	Saint-Clair
07226	07310	Saint-Clément
07227	07430	Saint-Cyr
07228	07340	Saint-Désirat
07229	07200	Saint-Didier-sous-Aubenas
07235	07510	Sainte-Eulalie
07266	07140	Sainte-Marguerite-Lafigère
07230	07200	Saint-Étienne-de-Boulogne
07231	07200	Saint-Étienne-de-Fontbellon
07232	07590	Saint-Étienne-de-Lugdarès
07233	07190	Saint-Étienne-de-Serre
07234	07340	Saint-Étienne-de-Valoux
07236	07410	Saint-Félicien
07237	07360	Saint-Fortunat-sur-Eyrieux
07238	07230	Saint-Genest-de-Beauzon
07239	07160	Saint-Genest-Lachamp
07240	07800	Saint-Georges-les-Bains
07241	07170	Saint-Germain
07242	07580	Saint-Gineys-en-Coiron
07243	07340	Saint-Jacques-d'Atticieux
07244	07240	Saint-Jean-Chambre
07245	07300	Saint-Jean-de-Muzols
07247	07580	Saint-Jean-le-Centenier
07248	07160	Saint-Jean-Roure
07249	07320	Saint-Jeure-d'Andaure
07250	07290	Saint-Jeure-d'Ay
07251	07530	Saint-Joseph-des-Bancs
07103	07310	Saint-Julien-d'Intres
07253	07190	Saint-Julien-du-Gua
07254	07200	Saint-Julien-du-Serre
07255	07000	Saint-Julien-en-Saint-Alban
07257	07240	Saint-Julien-le-Roux
07258	07690	Saint-Julien-Vocance
07259	07700	Saint-Just-d'Ardèche
07260	07210	Saint-Lager-Bressac
07261	07800	Saint-Laurent-du-Pape
07262	07590	Saint-Laurent-les-Bains-Laval-d'Aurelle
07263	07170	Saint-Laurent-sous-Coiron
07264	07700	Saint-Marcel-d'Ardèche
07265	07100	Saint-Marcel-lès-Annonay
07267	07310	Saint-Martial
07268	07700	Saint-Martin-d'Ardèche
07269	07310	Saint-Martin-de-Valamas
07270	07400	Saint-Martin-sur-Lavezon
07272	07200	Saint-Maurice-d'Ardèche
07273	07170	Saint-Maurice-d'Ibie
07274	07190	Saint-Maurice-en-Chalencon
07275	07260	Saint-Mélany
07276	07160	Saint-Michel-d'Aurance
07277	07200	Saint-Michel-de-Boulogne
07278	07360	Saint-Michel-de-Chabrillanoux
07279	07220	Saint-Montan
07280	07460	Saint-Paul-le-Jeune
07281	07130	Saint-Péray
07282	07450	Saint-Pierre-de-Colombier
07283	07400	Saint-Pierre-la-Roche
07284	07140	Saint-Pierre-Saint-Jean
07285	07520	Saint-Pierre-sur-Doux
07286	07190	Saint-Pierreville
07287	07580	Saint-Pons
07288	07000	Saint-Priest
07289	07200	Saint-Privat
07290	07270	Saint-Prix
07291	07700	Saint-Remèze
07292	07290	Saint-Romain-d'Ay
07293	07130	Saint-Romain-de-Lerps
07294	07460	Saint-Sauveur-de-Cruzières
07295	07190	Saint-Sauveur-de-Montagut
07296	07200	Saint-Sernin
07297	07440	Saint-Sylvestre
07299	07290	Saint-Symphorien-de-Mahun
07298	07210	Saint-Symphorien-sous-Chomérac
07300	07220	Saint-Thomé
07301	07410	Saint-Victor
07302	07210	Saint-Vincent-de-Barrès
07303	07360	Saint-Vincent-de-Durfort
07304	07150	Salavas
07305	07140	Les Salelles
07306	07120	Sampzon
07307	07110	Sanilhac
07308	07370	Sarras
07309	07290	Satillieu
07310	07430	Savas
07311	07400	Sceautres
07312	07610	Sécheras
07313	07340	Serrières
07314	07240	Silhac
07315	07380	La Souche
07316	07130	Soyons
07317	07340	Talencieux
07318	07110	Tauriers
07319	07400	Le Teil
07321	07340	Thorrenc
07322	07330	Thueyts
07323	07130	Toulaud
07324	07300	Tournon-sur-Rhône
07325	07200	Ucel
07326	07510	Usclades-et-Rieutord
07327	07110	Uzer
07328	07150	Vagnas
07329	07110	Valgorge
07011	07530	Vallées-d'Antraigues-Asperjoc
07330	07150	Vallon-Pont-d'Arc
07331	07600	Vals-les-Bains
07332	07400	Valvignères
07333	07690	Vanosc
07334	07140	Les Vans
07335	07410	Vaudevant
07336	07260	Vernon
07337	07430	Vernosc-lès-Annonay
07338	07240	Vernoux-en-Vivarais
07339	07200	Vesseaux
07340	07000	Veyras
07341	07170	Villeneuve-de-Berg
07342	07690	Villevocance
07343	07110	Vinezac
07344	07340	Vinzieux
07345	07610	Vion
07346	07220	Viviers
07347	07690	Vocance
07348	07200	Vogüé
07349	07800	La Voulte-sur-Rhône
