= Saint-Barthélemy-le-Meil =

- Commune
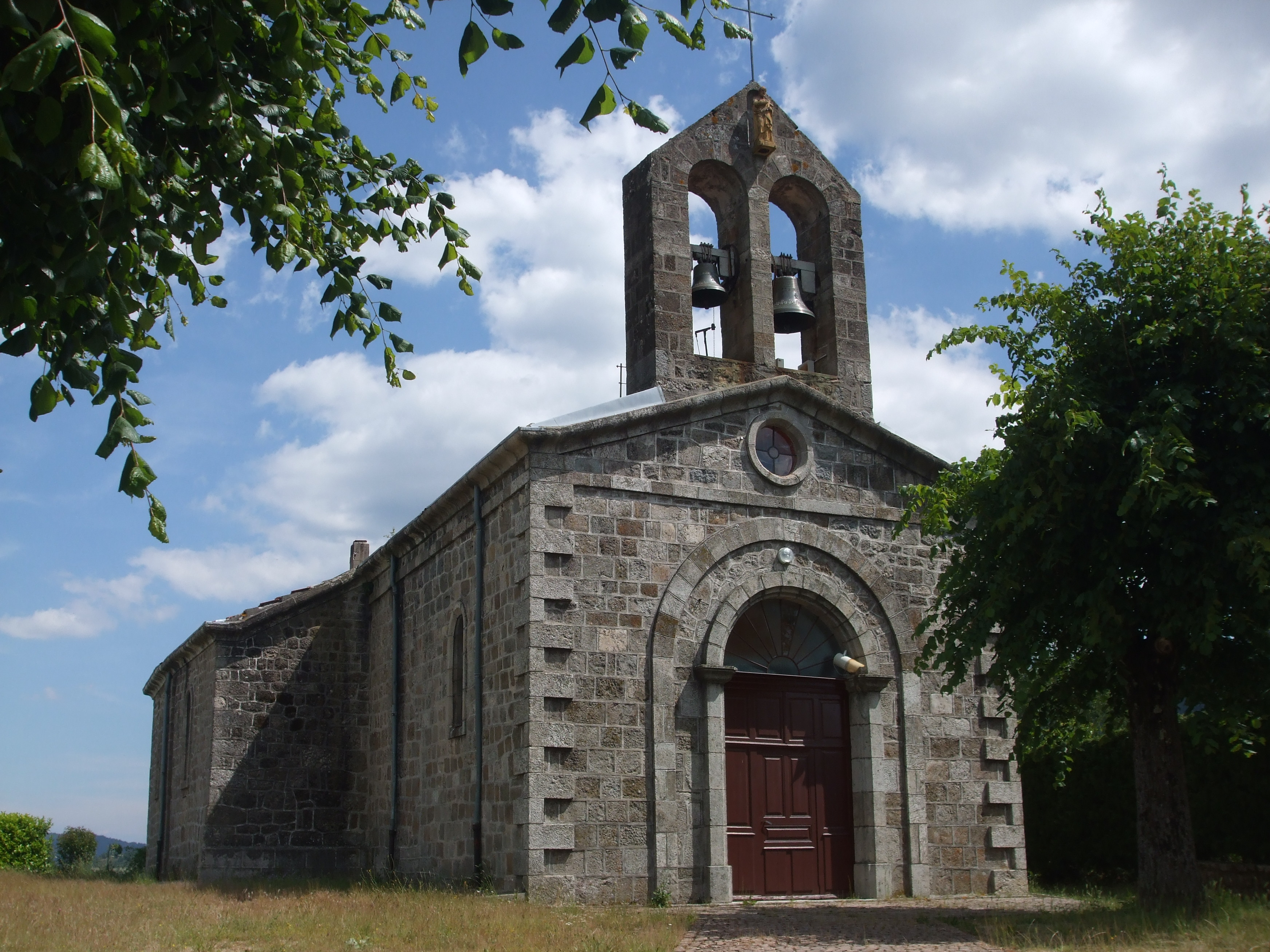
- The church in Saint-Barthélemy-le-Meil
- Location of Saint-Barthélemy-le-Meil
- Location within France Location within Auvergne-Rhône-Alpes
- Coordinates: 44°53′08″N 4°29′56″E
- Country: France
- Region: Auvergne-Rhône-Alpes
- Department: Ardèche
- Arrondissement: Tournon-sur-Rhône
- Canton: Haut-Eyrieux

Government
  - Mayor (2022–2026): Céline Sausse
- Area^{1}: 7.35 km^{2} (2.84 sq mi)
- Elevation: 500 m (1,600 ft)
- Highest elevation: 800 m (2,600 ft)
- Lowest elevation: 340 m (1,120 ft)
- Population (2023): 201
  - Density: 27.3/km^{2} (70.8/sq mi)
- Time zone: UTC+01:00 (CET)
  - Summer (DST): UTC+02:00 (CEST)
- INSEE/Postal code: 07215 /07160
- ^{1} French Land Register data, which excludes lakes, ponds, glaciers > 1 km^{2} (0.386 sq mi or 247 acres) and river estuaries.

Saint-Barthélemy-le-Meil (French pronunciation: [sɛ̃ baʁtelemi lə mɛj]; Occitan: Sant Bartomieu Amelh) is a commune in the Ardèche department in southern France.

== Population ==
Historical population
Year	Pop.	±% p.a.
1968	285	—
1975	239	−2.48%
1982	229	−0.61%
1990	223	−0.33%
1999	222	−0.05%
2007	211	−0.63%
2012	204	−0.67%
2017	195	−0.90%
2023	201	+0.51%
Source: INSEE

== See also ==
- Communes of the Ardèche department
