= Rochepaule =

- Commune
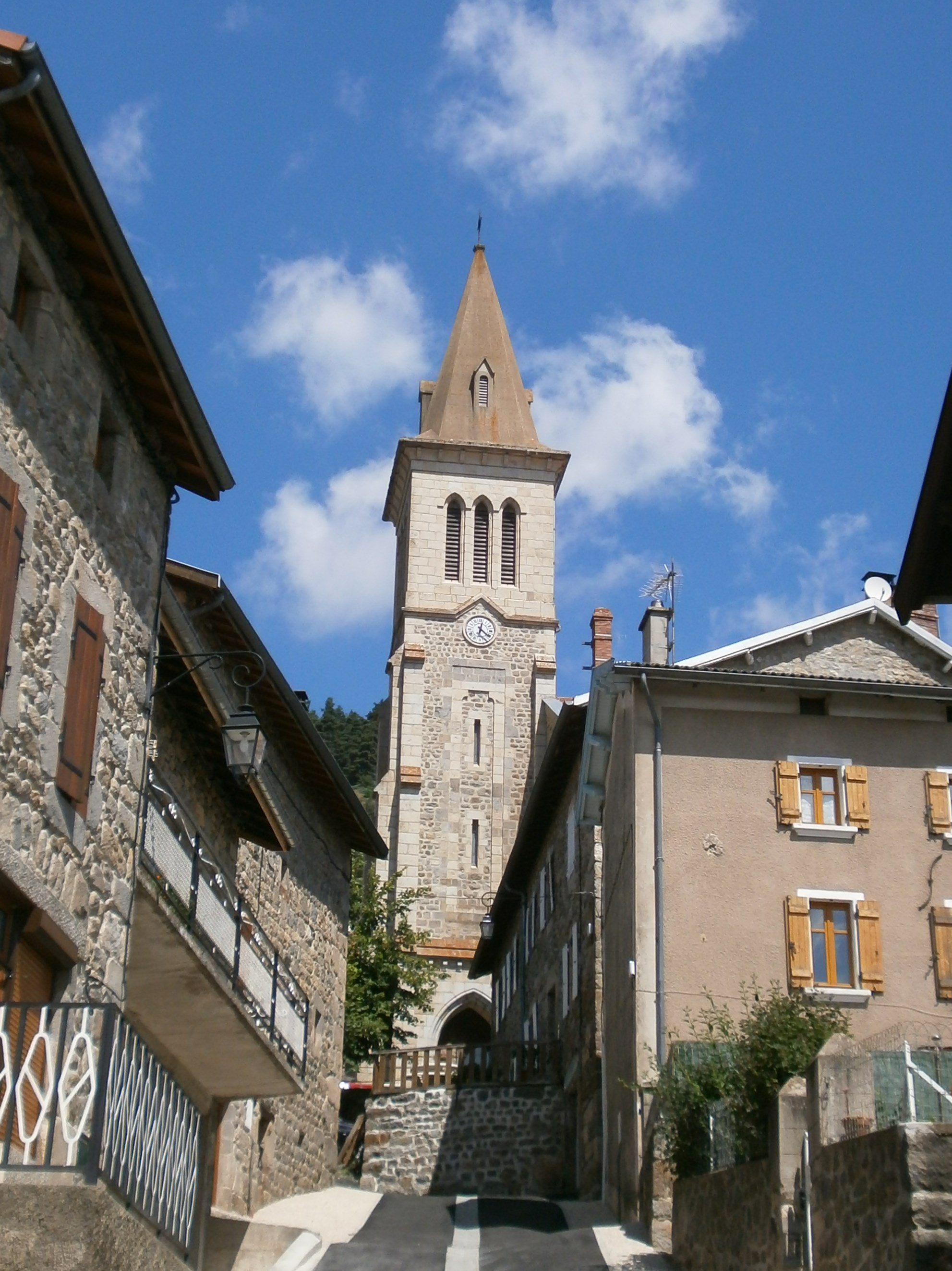
- The church and surroundings in Rochepaule
- Location of Rochepaule
- Location within France Location within Auvergne-Rhône-Alpes
- Coordinates: 45°04′39″N 4°27′23″E
- Country: France
- Region: Auvergne-Rhône-Alpes
- Department: Ardèche
- Arrondissement: Tournon-sur-Rhône
- Canton: Haut-Eyrieux

Government
  - Mayor (2020–2026): Jean-Marie Foutry
- Area^{1}: 33.34 km^{2} (12.87 sq mi)
- Elevation: 810 m (2,660 ft)
- Highest elevation: 1,191 m (3,907 ft)
- Lowest elevation: 553 m (1,814 ft)
- Population (2023): 237
  - Density: 7.11/km^{2} (18.4/sq mi)
- Time zone: UTC+01:00 (CET)
  - Summer (DST): UTC+02:00 (CEST)
- INSEE/Postal code: 07192 /07320
- ^{1} French Land Register data, which excludes lakes, ponds, glaciers > 1 km^{2} (0.386 sq mi or 247 acres) and river estuaries.

Rochepaule (French pronunciation: [ʁɔʃpol]; Occitan: Ròchapaula) is a commune in the Ardèche department in southern France.

== Population ==
Historical population
Year	Pop.	±% p.a.
1968	589	—
1975	480	−2.88%
1982	464	−0.48%
1990	404	−1.72%
1999	341	−1.87%
2007	302	−1.51%
2012	277	−1.71%
2017	259	−1.33%
2023	237	−1.47%
Source: INSEE

== See also ==
- Communes of the Ardèche department
