= Issamoulenc =

- Commune
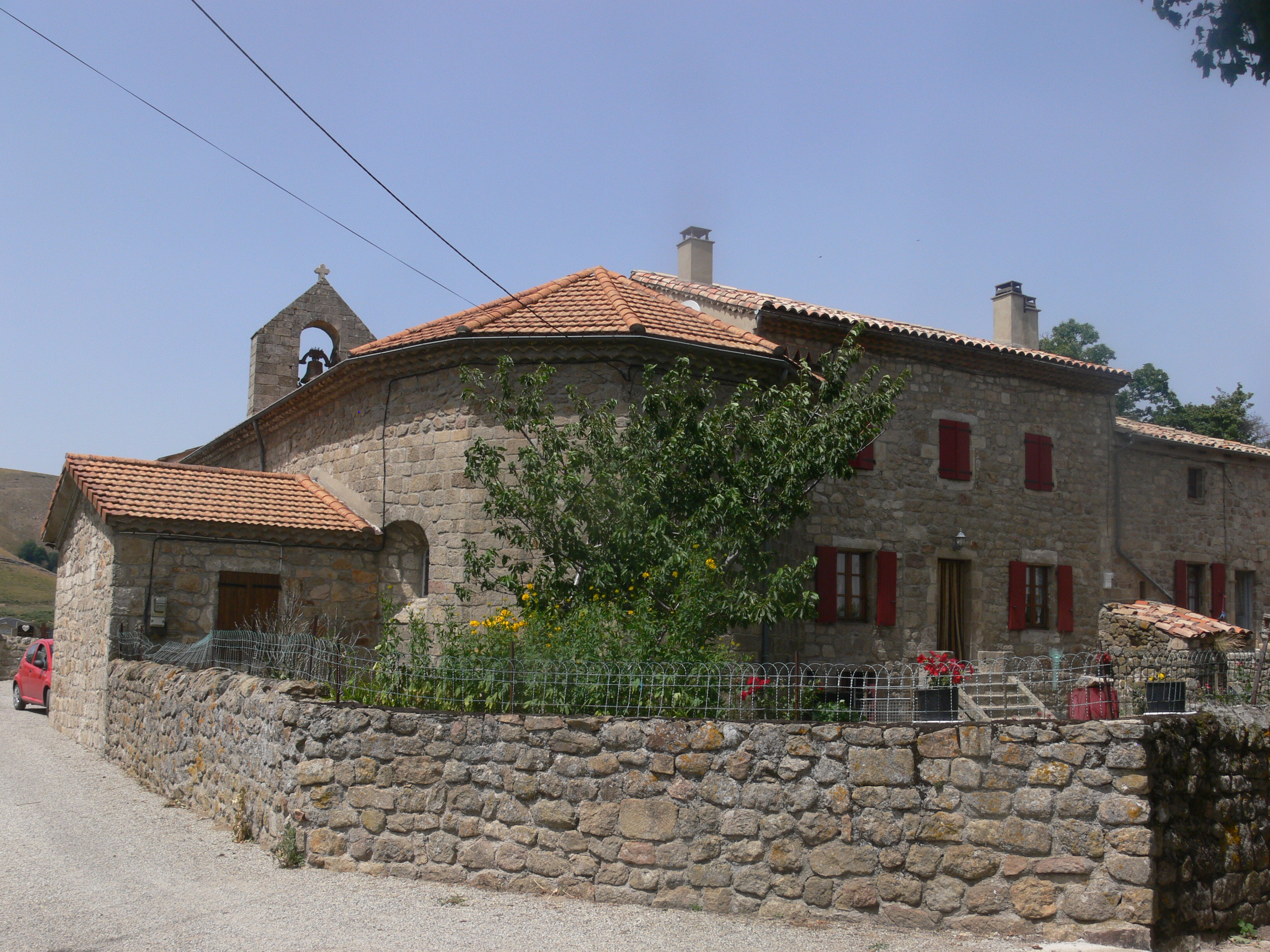
- The farm and church in Issamoulenc
- Location of Issamoulenc
- Location within France Location within Auvergne-Rhône-Alpes
- Coordinates: 44°46′59″N 4°28′35″E
- Country: France
- Region: Auvergne-Rhône-Alpes
- Department: Ardèche
- Arrondissement: Tournon-sur-Rhône
- Canton: Haut-Eyrieux

Government
  - Mayor (2020–2026): Philippe Creston
- Area^{1}: 15.66 km^{2} (6.05 sq mi)
- Elevation: 600 m (2,000 ft)
- Highest elevation: 1,240 m (4,070 ft)
- Lowest elevation: 394 m (1,293 ft)
- Population (2023): 107
  - Density: 6.83/km^{2} (17.7/sq mi)
- Time zone: UTC+01:00 (CET)
  - Summer (DST): UTC+02:00 (CEST)
- INSEE/Postal code: 07104 /07190
- ^{1} French Land Register data, which excludes lakes, ponds, glaciers > 1 km^{2} (0.386 sq mi or 247 acres) and river estuaries.

Issamoulenc is a commune in the Ardèche department in southern France.

== Population ==
Historical population
Year	Pop.	±% p.a.
1968	218	—
1975	162	−4.15%
1982	142	−1.86%
1990	112	−2.92%
1999	96	−1.70%
2007	104	+1.01%
2012	112	+1.49%
2017	91	−4.07%
2023	107	+2.74%
Source: INSEE

== See also ==
- Communes of the Ardèche department
