= Canton of Haut-Eyrieux =

Coordinates: 44.91°N 4.42°E

- Canton
- Situation of the canton of Haut-Eyrieux in the department of Ardèche
- Country: France
- Region: Auvergne-Rhône-Alpes
- Department: Ardèche
- No. of communes: {{{nbcomm}}}
- Population (2023): 17,745
- INSEE code: 0706

The canton of Haut-Eyrieux (before 2016: canton of Le Cheylard) is an administrative division of the Ardèche department, southern France. Its borders were modified at the French canton reorganisation which came into effect in March 2015. Its seat is in Le Cheylard.

It consists of the following communes:

1. Accons
2. Albon-d'Ardèche
3. Arcens
4. Beauvène
5. Belsentes
6. Borée
7. Chalencon
8. Le Chambon
9. Chanéac
10. Le Cheylard
11. Devesset
12. Dornas
13. Dunière-sur-Eyrieux
14. Gluiras
15. Issamoulenc
16. Jaunac
17. Lachapelle-sous-Chanéac
18. Marcols-les-Eaux
19. Mariac
20. Mars
21. Les Ollières-sur-Eyrieux
22. Rochepaule
23. La Rochette
24. Saint-Agrève
25. Saint-Andéol-de-Fourchades
26. Saint-André-en-Vivarais
27. Saint-Barthélemy-le-Meil
28. Saint-Christol
29. Saint-Cierge-sous-le-Cheylard
30. Saint-Clément
31. Saint-Étienne-de-Serre
32. Saint-Genest-Lachamp
33. Saint-Jean-Roure
34. Saint-Jeure-d'Andaure
35. Saint-Julien-d'Intres
36. Saint-Julien-du-Gua
37. Saint-Martial
38. Saint-Martin-de-Valamas
39. Saint-Maurice-en-Chalencon
40. Saint-Michel-d'Aurance
41. Saint-Michel-de-Chabrillanoux
42. Saint-Pierreville
43. Saint-Sauveur-de-Montagut
44. Saint-Vincent-de-Durfort
