= Mariac =

- Commune
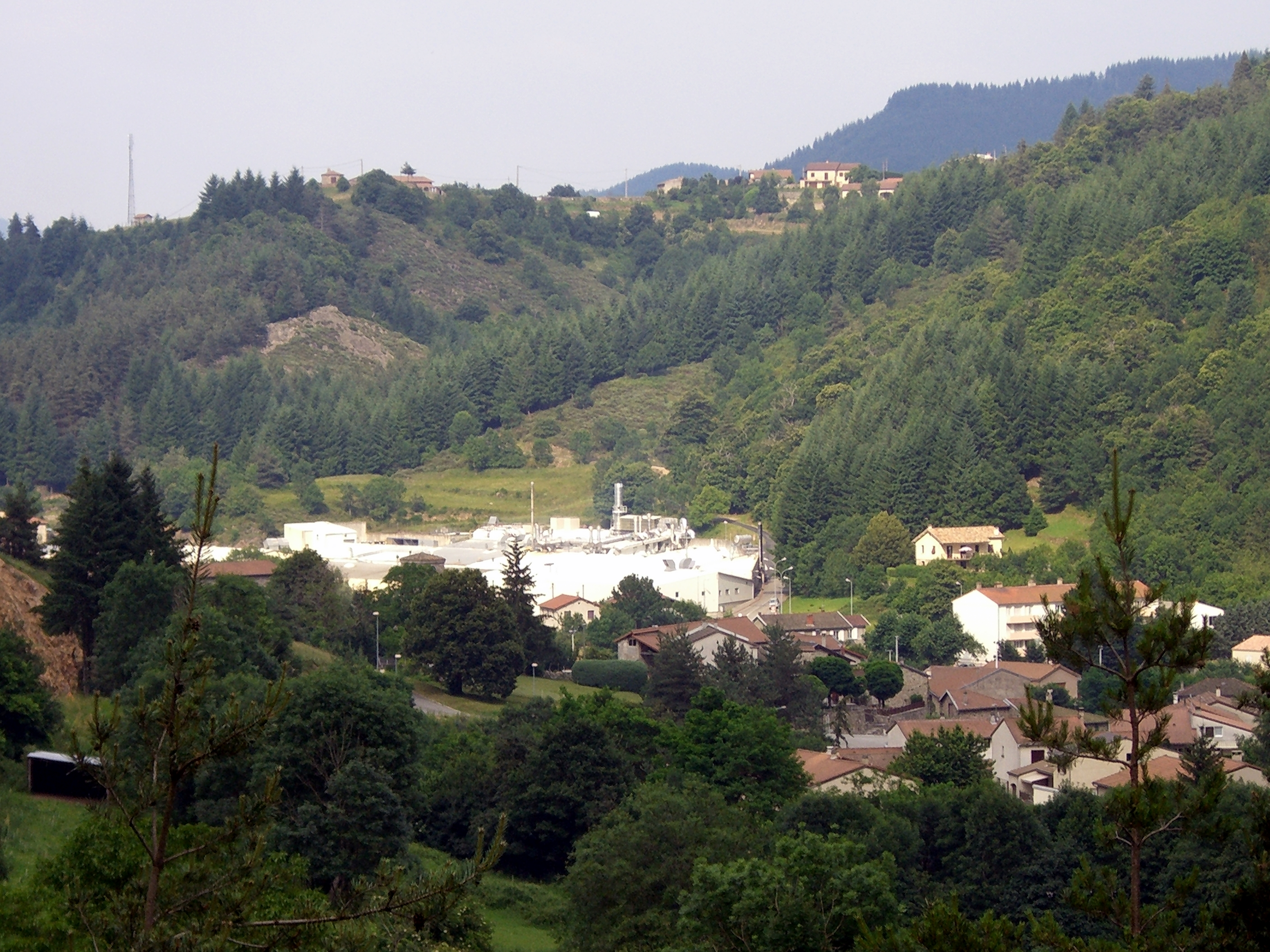
- The quarter of Pont-de-Fromentières, in Mariac
- Location of Mariac
- Location within France Location within Auvergne-Rhône-Alpes
- Coordinates: 44°52′54″N 4°21′54″E
- Country: France
- Region: Auvergne-Rhône-Alpes
- Department: Ardèche
- Arrondissement: Tournon-sur-Rhône
- Canton: Haut-Eyrieux

Government
  - Mayor (2020–2026): Marcel Cotta
- Area^{1}: 16.39 km^{2} (6.33 sq mi)
- Elevation: 520 m (1,710 ft)
- Highest elevation: 1,075 m (3,527 ft)
- Lowest elevation: 508 m (1,667 ft)
- Population (2023): 541
  - Density: 33.0/km^{2} (85.5/sq mi)
- Time zone: UTC+01:00 (CET)
  - Summer (DST): UTC+02:00 (CEST)
- INSEE/Postal code: 07150 /07160
- ^{1} French Land Register data, which excludes lakes, ponds, glaciers > 1 km^{2} (0.386 sq mi or 247 acres) and river estuaries.

Mariac (French pronunciation: [maʁjak]) is a commune in the Ardèche department in the south of France.

== Population ==
Historical population
Year	Pop.	±% p.a.
1968	820	—
1975	816	−0.07%
1982	789	−0.48%
1990	788	−0.02%
1999	732	−0.82%
2007	708	−0.42%
2012	628	−2.37%
2017	572	−1.85%
2023	541	−0.92%
Source: INSEE

== See also ==
- Communes of the Ardèche department
