= Saint-Andéol-de-Fourchades =

- Commune
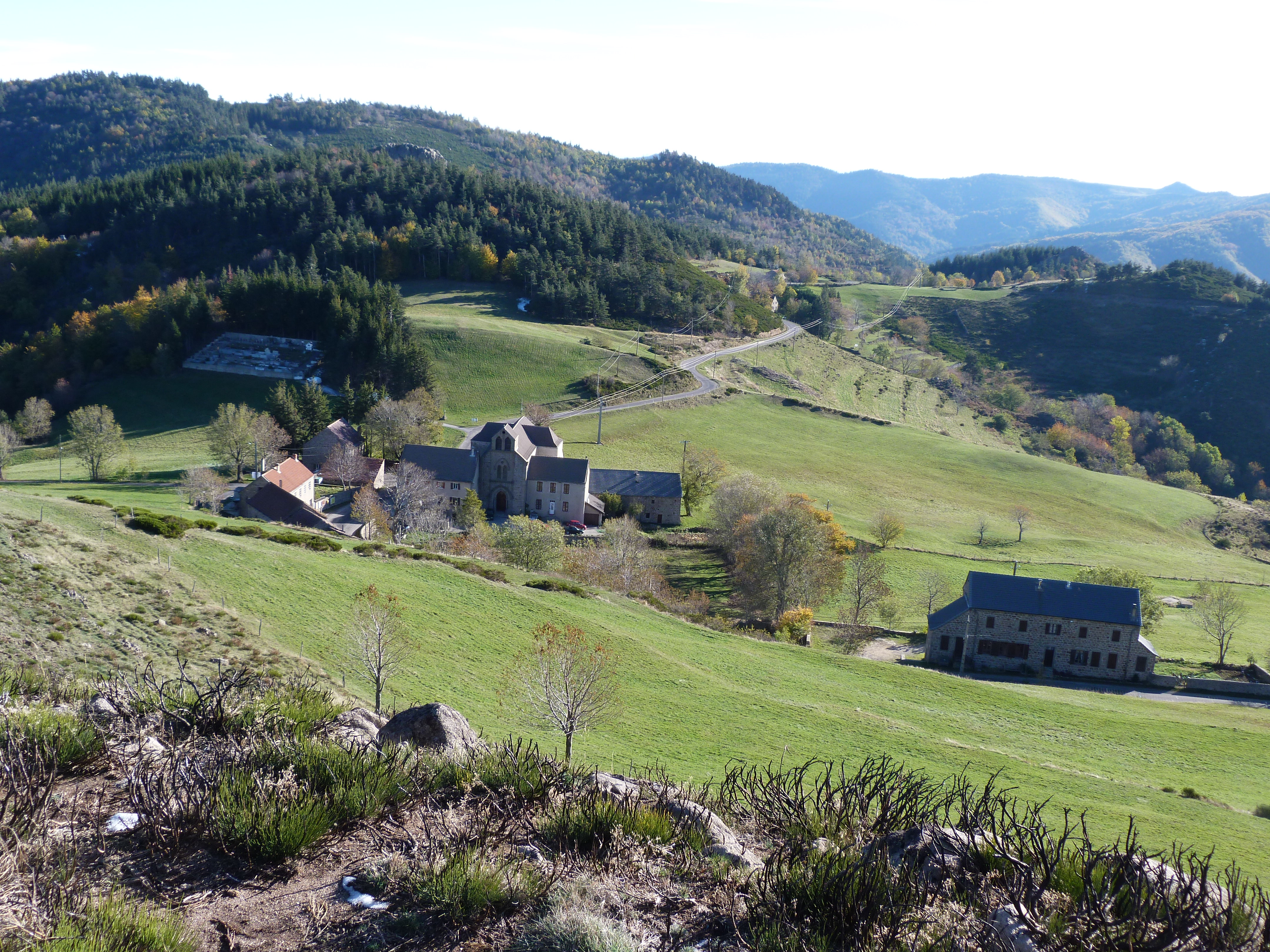
- A general view of Saint-Andéol-de-Fourchades
- Location of Saint-Andéol-de-Fourchades
- Location within France Location within Auvergne-Rhône-Alpes
- Coordinates: 44°50′58″N 4°17′59″E
- Country: France
- Region: Auvergne-Rhône-Alpes
- Department: Ardèche
- Arrondissement: Tournon-sur-Rhône
- Canton: Haut-Eyrieux

Government
  - Mayor (2020–2026): Josyane Allard Chalancon
- Area^{1}: 16.47 km^{2} (6.36 sq mi)
- Elevation: 1,029 m (3,376 ft)
- Highest elevation: 1,486 m (4,875 ft)
- Lowest elevation: 727 m (2,385 ft)
- Population (2023): 52
  - Density: 3.2/km^{2} (8.2/sq mi)
- Time zone: UTC+01:00 (CET)
  - Summer (DST): UTC+02:00 (CEST)
- INSEE/Postal code: 07209 /07160
- ^{1} French Land Register data, which excludes lakes, ponds, glaciers > 1 km^{2} (0.386 sq mi or 247 acres) and river estuaries.

Saint-Andéol-de-Fourchades (French pronunciation: [sɛ̃.t‿ɑ̃deɔl də fuʁʃad]; Occitan: Sant Andiòu de Forchadas) is a commune in the Ardèche department in the Auvergne-Rhône-Alpes region in southern France.

== Population ==
Historical population
Year	Pop.	±% p.a.
1968	131	—
1975	101	−3.65%
1982	104	+0.42%
1990	99	−0.61%
1999	89	−1.18%
2007	57	−5.42%
2012	56	−0.35%
2017	53	−1.10%
2023	52	−0.32%
Source: INSEE

== See also ==
- Communes of the Ardèche department
