= Chanéac =

- Commune
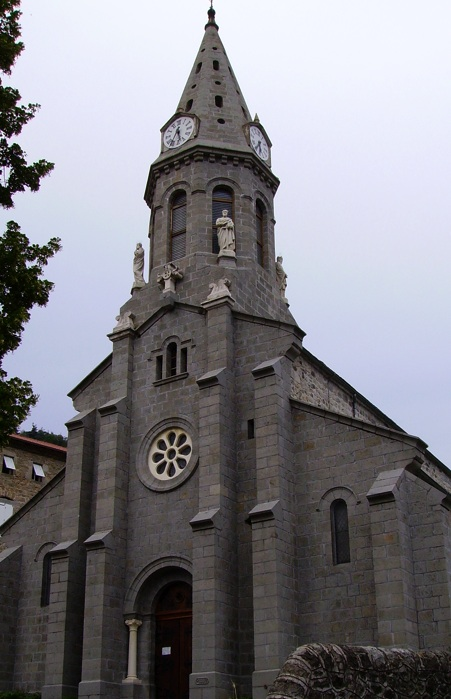
- The church in Chanéac
- Location of Chanéac
- Location within France Location within Auvergne-Rhône-Alpes
- Coordinates: 44°56′02″N 4°19′13″E
- Country: France
- Region: Auvergne-Rhône-Alpes
- Department: Ardèche
- Arrondissement: Tournon-sur-Rhône
- Canton: Haut-Eyrieux

Government
  - Mayor (2020–2026): Didier Rochette
- Area^{1}: 15.73 km^{2} (6.07 sq mi)
- Elevation: 700 m (2,300 ft)
- Highest elevation: 1,271 m (4,170 ft)
- Lowest elevation: 540 m (1,770 ft)
- Population (2023): 254
  - Density: 16.1/km^{2} (41.8/sq mi)
- Time zone: UTC+01:00 (CET)
  - Summer (DST): UTC+02:00 (CEST)
- INSEE/Postal code: 07054 /07310
- ^{1} French Land Register data, which excludes lakes, ponds, glaciers > 1 km^{2} (0.386 sq mi or 247 acres) and river estuaries.

Chanéac (French pronunciation: [ʃaneak]; Occitan: Chanhac) is a commune in the Ardèche department in southern France.

== Population ==
Historical population
| Year | Pop. | ±% p.a. |
|---|---|---|
| 1968 | 313 | — |
| 1975 | 253 | −2.99% |
| 1982 | 243 | −0.57% |
| 1990 | 243 | +0.00% |
| 1999 | 268 | +1.09% |
| 2007 | 271 | +0.14% |
| 2012 | 265 | −0.45% |
| 2017 | 256 | −0.69% |
| 2023 | 254 | −0.13% |
Source: INSEE

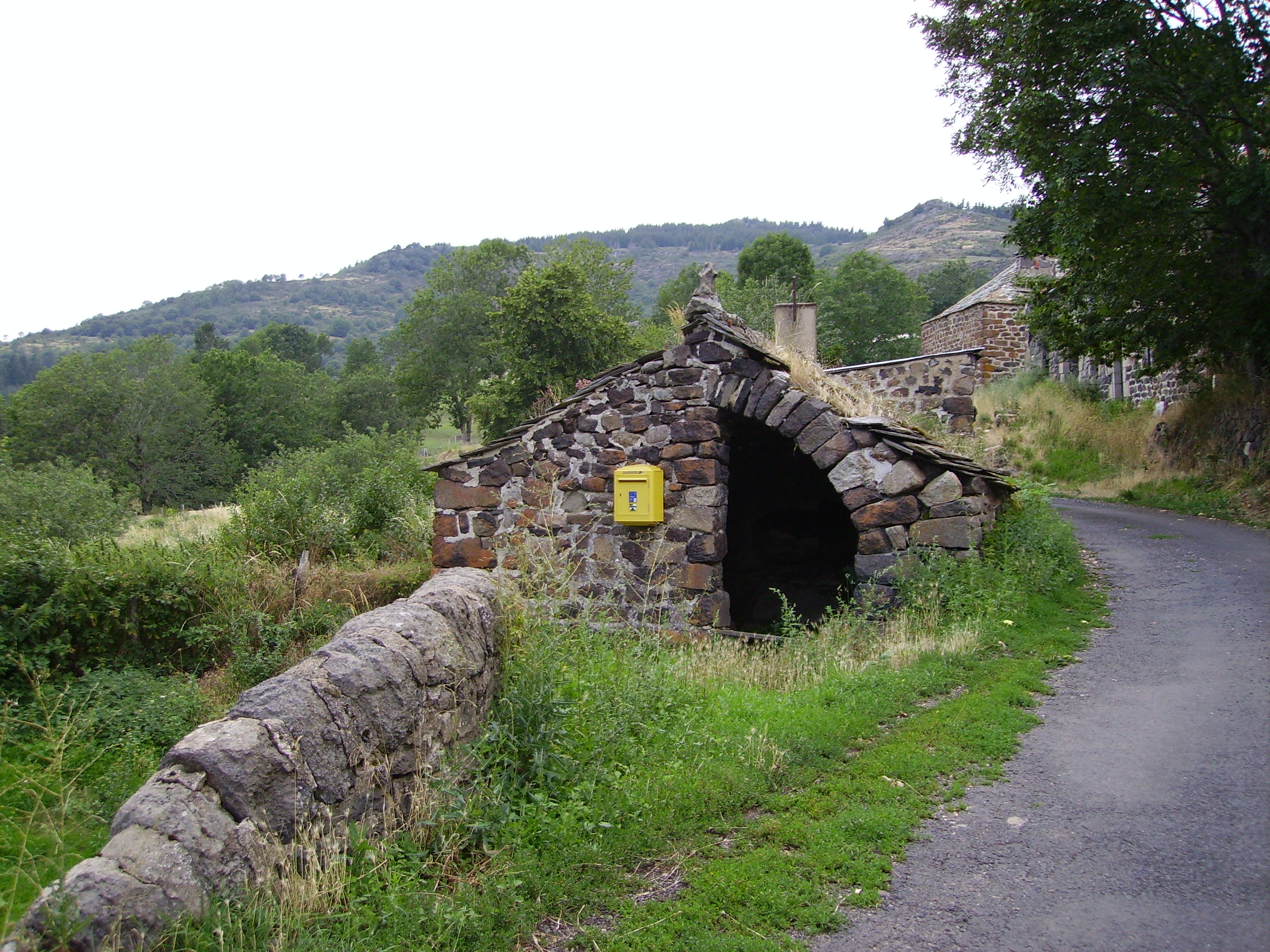
The hamlet of Serres in the town of Chanéac

== See also ==
- Communes of the Ardèche department
