= Le Cheylard =

- Commune
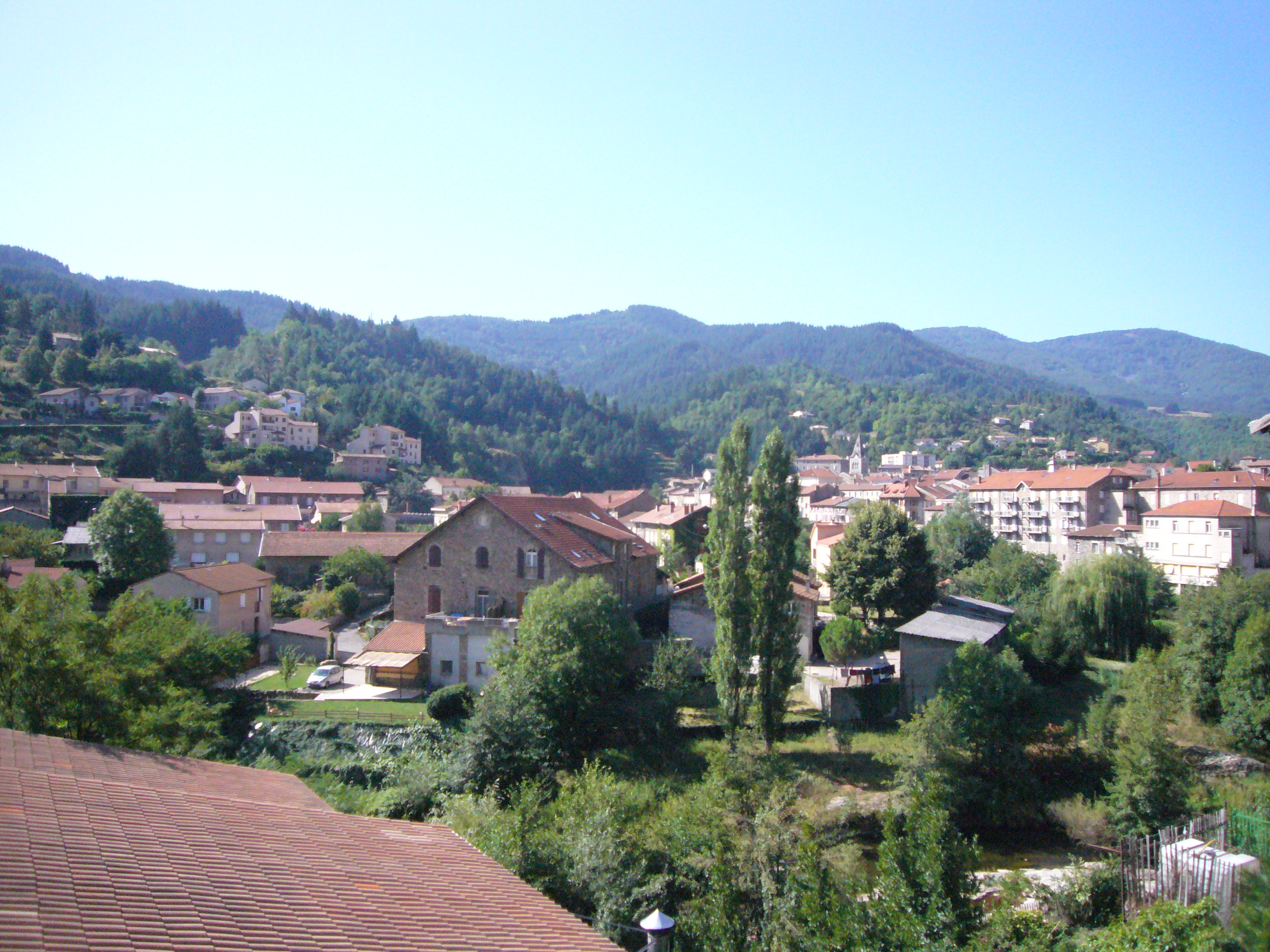
- A general view of Le Cheylard

- Coat of arms
- Location of Le Cheylard
- Location within France Location within Auvergne-Rhône-Alpes
- Coordinates: 44°54′22″N 4°25′23″E
- Country: France
- Region: Auvergne-Rhône-Alpes
- Department: Ardèche
- Arrondissement: Tournon-sur-Rhône
- Canton: Haut-Eyrieux

Government
  - Mayor (2020–2026): Jacques Chabal
- Area^{1}: 13.45 km^{2} (5.19 sq mi)
- Elevation: 430 m (1,410 ft)
- Highest elevation: 927 m (3,041 ft)
- Lowest elevation: 404 m (1,325 ft)
- Population (2023): 2,803
  - Density: 208.4/km^{2} (539.8/sq mi)
- Time zone: UTC+01:00 (CET)
  - Summer (DST): UTC+02:00 (CEST)
- INSEE/Postal code: 07064 /07160
- ^{1} French Land Register data, which excludes lakes, ponds, glaciers > 1 km^{2} (0.386 sq mi or 247 acres) and river estuaries.

Le Cheylard (French pronunciation: [lə ʃelaʁ]; Occitan: Lo Chailar) is a commune in the Ardèche department in southern France.

== Population ==
Historical population

Year	Pop.	±% p.a.
1793	1,717	—
1800	1,722	+0.04%
1806	2,024	+2.73%
1821	2,008	−0.05%
1831	2,252	+1.15%
1836	2,542	+2.45%
1841	2,353	−1.53%
1846	2,512	+1.32%
1851	2,498	−0.11%
1856	3,257	+5.45%
1861	3,755	+2.89%
1866	3,422	−1.84%
1872	3,224	−0.99%
1876	3,242	+0.14%
1881	3,059	−1.16%
1886	3,054	−0.03%
1891	3,228	+1.11%
1896	3,198	−0.19%
1901	3,373	+1.07%

Year	Pop.	±% p.a.
1906	3,507	+0.78%
1911	3,478	−0.17%
1921	3,078	−1.21%
1926	3,098	+0.13%
1931	3,296	+1.25%
1936	3,288	−0.05%
1946	3,515	+0.67%
1954	3,502	−0.05%
1962	3,735	+0.81%
1968	3,979	+1.06%
1975	4,262	+0.99%
1982	4,239	−0.08%
1990	3,833	−1.25%
1999	3,514	−0.96%
2007	3,313	−0.73%
2012	3,098	−1.33%
2017	2,952	−0.96%
2023	2,803	−0.86%

Source: EHESS and INSEE (1968-2023)

== See also ==
- Communes of the Ardèche department
