= Satillieu =

- Commune
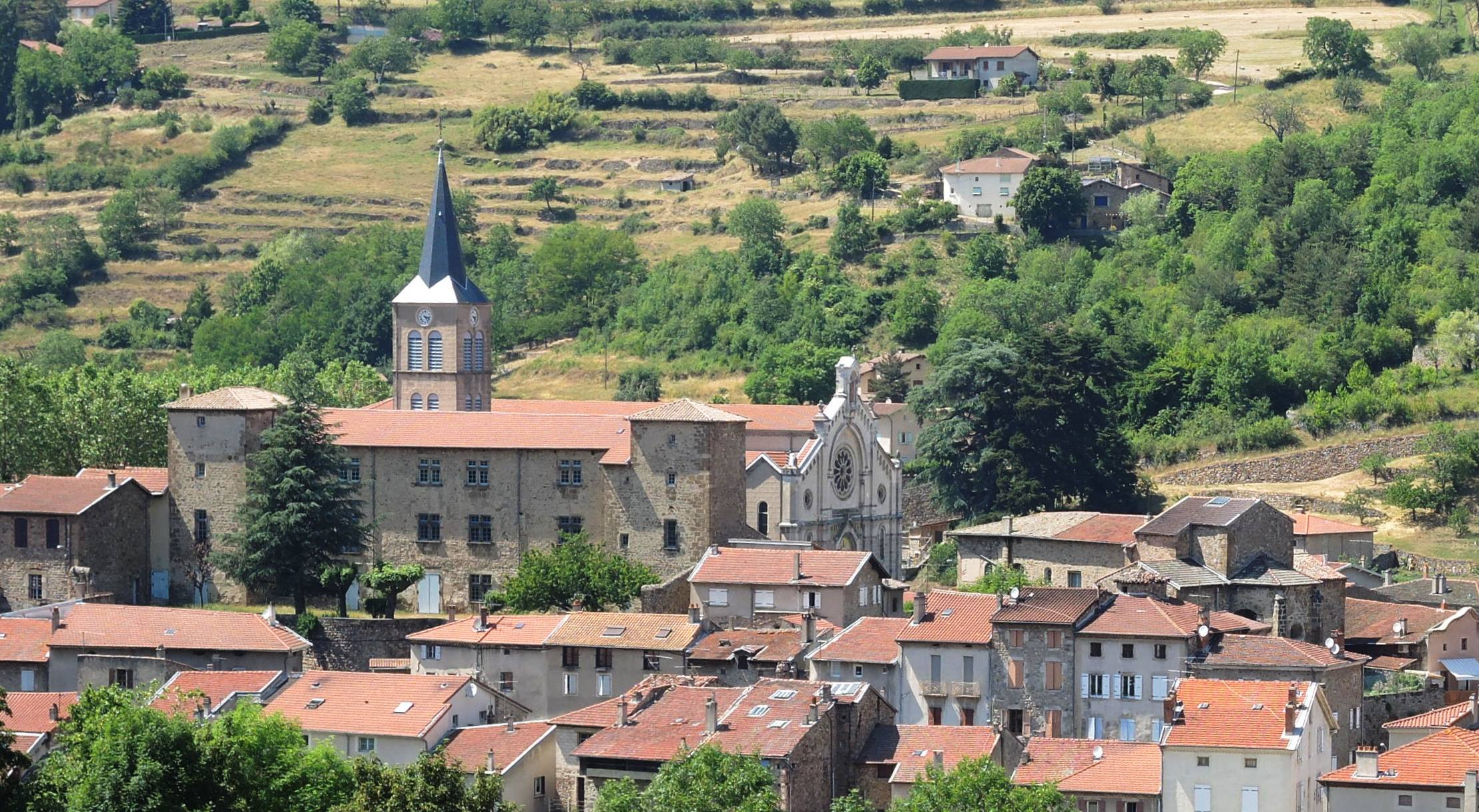
- Satillieu seen from the south

- Coat of arms
- Location of Satillieu
- Location within France Location within Auvergne-Rhône-Alpes
- Coordinates: 45°09′05″N 4°36′53″E
- Country: France
- Region: Auvergne-Rhône-Alpes
- Department: Ardèche
- Arrondissement: Tournon-sur-Rhône
- Canton: Haut-Vivarais
- Intercommunality: Val d'Ay

Government
  - Mayor (2020–2026): Marie Vercasson
- Area^{1}: 32.82 km^{2} (12.67 sq mi)
- Elevation: 476 m (1,562 ft)
- Highest elevation: 1,225 m (4,019 ft)
- Lowest elevation: 433 m (1,421 ft)
- Population (2023): 1,534
  - Density: 46.74/km^{2} (121.1/sq mi)
- Time zone: UTC+01:00 (CET)
  - Summer (DST): UTC+02:00 (CEST)
- INSEE/Postal code: 07309 /07290
- ^{1} French Land Register data, which excludes lakes, ponds, glaciers > 1 km^{2} (0.386 sq mi or 247 acres) and river estuaries.

Satillieu (French pronunciation: [satiljø]; Occitan: Satiliu) is a commune in the Ardèche department in southern France. The small commune has a private and public elementary school.

== Geography ==
Satillieu is located on the Ay river, about 16 km (10 mi) south-southwest of Annonay. It borders Saint-Alban-d'Ay to the north, Saint-Romain-d'Ay to the northeast, Préaux to the east, Vaudevant to the southeast, Pailharès to the south, Lafarre and Lalouvesc to the southwest and west, Saint-Symphorien-de-Mahun to the west, and Vocance to the northwest.

The former Route nationale 578 passes through the commune.

== Population ==
Historical population
Year	Pop.	±% p.a.
1968	1,998	—
1975	1,972	−0.19%
1982	1,854	−0.88%
1990	1,818	−0.24%
1999	1,592	−1.46%
2007	1,606	+0.11%
2012	1,611	+0.06%
2017	1,546	−0.82%
2023	1,534	−0.13%
Source: INSEE

== See also ==
- Communes of the Ardèche department
