= Ardoix =

- Commune
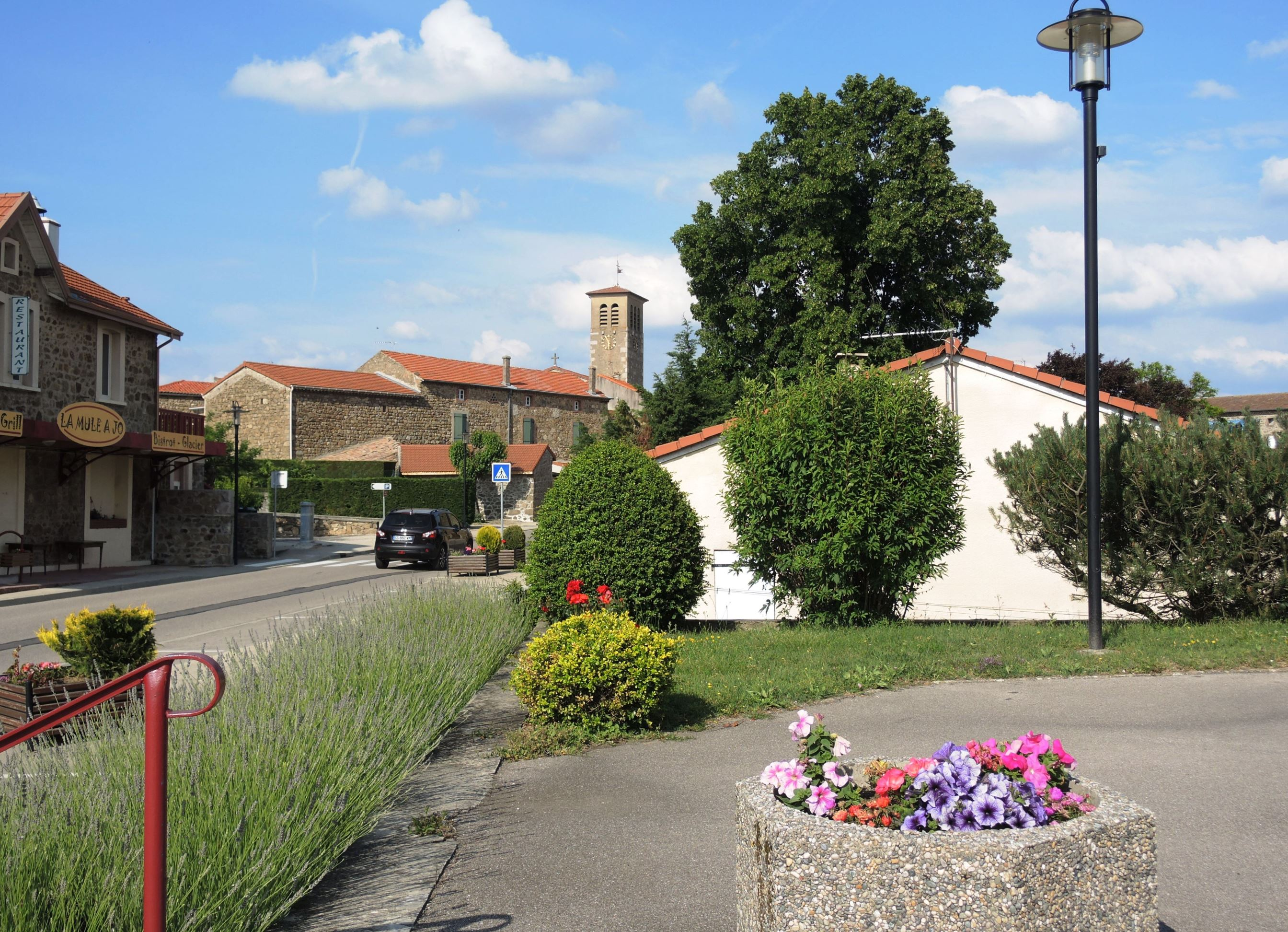
- The church and surroundings in Ardoix
- Location of Ardoix
- Location within France Location within Auvergne-Rhône-Alpes
- Coordinates: 45°11′16″N 4°44′14″E
- Country: France
- Region: Auvergne-Rhône-Alpes
- Department: Ardèche
- Arrondissement: Tournon-sur-Rhône
- Canton: Haut-Vivarais
- Intercommunality: Annonay Rhône Agglo

Government
  - Mayor (2020–2026): Sylvie Bonnet
- Area^{1}: 12.15 km^{2} (4.69 sq mi)
- Elevation: 360 m (1,180 ft)
- Highest elevation: 397 m (1,302 ft)
- Lowest elevation: 147 m (482 ft)
- Population (2023): 1,308
  - Density: 107.7/km^{2} (278.8/sq mi)
- Time zone: UTC+01:00 (CET)
  - Summer (DST): UTC+02:00 (CEST)
- INSEE/Postal code: 07013 /07290
- ^{1} French Land Register data, which excludes lakes, ponds, glaciers > 1 km^{2} (0.386 sq mi or 247 acres) and river estuaries.

Ardoix (French pronunciation: [aʁdwa]; Occitan: Ardoitz) is a commune in the Ardèche department in the Auvergne-Rhône-Alpes region of southern France.

== Geography ==
Adoix is located some 7 km west by north-west of Saint-Vallier and 14 km south-east of Annonay. Access to the commune is by the D221 road from Sarras in the east passing through the length of the commune and the village and continuing south-west to Saint-Romain-d'Ay. Apart from the village there are the hamlets of Corme, Bruas, Thoue, and Chamas. The commune is a valley between two mountain ranges and apart from the slopes of the mountains is entirely farmland.

The Cance river forms a large part of the northern border of the commune as it flows east to the Rhone river. Many small tributaries of the Cance rise in the commune including the Ruisseau de la Goueille which forms the north-western border. The Ay river forms the southern border of the commune and also flows east to the Rhone.

== History ==
In the gift of Quintenas made by Charlemagne to the Benedictine Abbey of Saint-Claude on 23 August 776, the Church of Saint-Didier d'Ardoix was mentioned. Also dependent on Saint Claude were the Chapel of Oriol, Saint-Alban-d'Ay, Saint-Jeure-d'Ay, Saint-Romain-d'Ay, and the chapel of Our Lady of Ay. In 1557 Ardoix, as was Quintenas, were secularized and thereafter administered by the Diocese of Vienne.

The old land of Ardoix had its chateaux and towers. Oriol, Munat, Manoha, Léorat, and le Pestrin Manoha was a fortified house and farm in medieval times. It is still a rural area today. The tower of Oriol is all that remains of the medieval castle which overlooked the gorges of the Ay. During the Hundred Years War it was sacked by soldiers. Taking advantage of the wars of religion, a criminal from Vernoux, Erard, took it and restored it to make it his lair. Farmers, frustrated by his robberies destroyed the castle to dislodge the bandit (who was hanged at Lamastre).

== Administration ==
List of Successive Mayors

From	To	Name
2001	2008	Michel Becheras
2008	incumbent	Sylvie Bonnet

== Demography ==
The inhabitants of the commune are known as Ardoisiens or Ardoisiennes in French.

Historical population

Year	Pop.	±% p.a.
1793	300	—
1800	517	+8.09%
1806	761	+6.66%
1821	765	+0.03%
1831	800	+0.45%
1836	757	−1.10%
1841	854	+2.44%
1846	800	−1.30%
1851	863	+1.53%
1856	874	+0.25%
1861	920	+1.03%
1866	942	+0.47%
1872	911	−0.56%
1876	926	+0.41%
1881	911	−0.33%
1886	841	−1.59%
1891	856	+0.35%
1896	857	+0.02%
1901	805	−1.24%

Year	Pop.	±% p.a.
1906	802	−0.07%
1911	740	−1.60%
1921	651	−1.27%
1926	662	+0.34%
1931	662	+0.00%
1936	633	−0.89%
1946	616	−0.27%
1954	585	−0.64%
1962	512	−1.65%
1968	546	+1.08%
1975	594	+1.21%
1982	638	+1.03%
1990	696	+1.09%
1999	779	+1.26%
2007	985	+2.98%
2012	1,115	+2.51%
2017	1,262	+2.51%
2023	1,308	+0.60%

Source: EHESS and INSEE

== Sites and Monuments ==
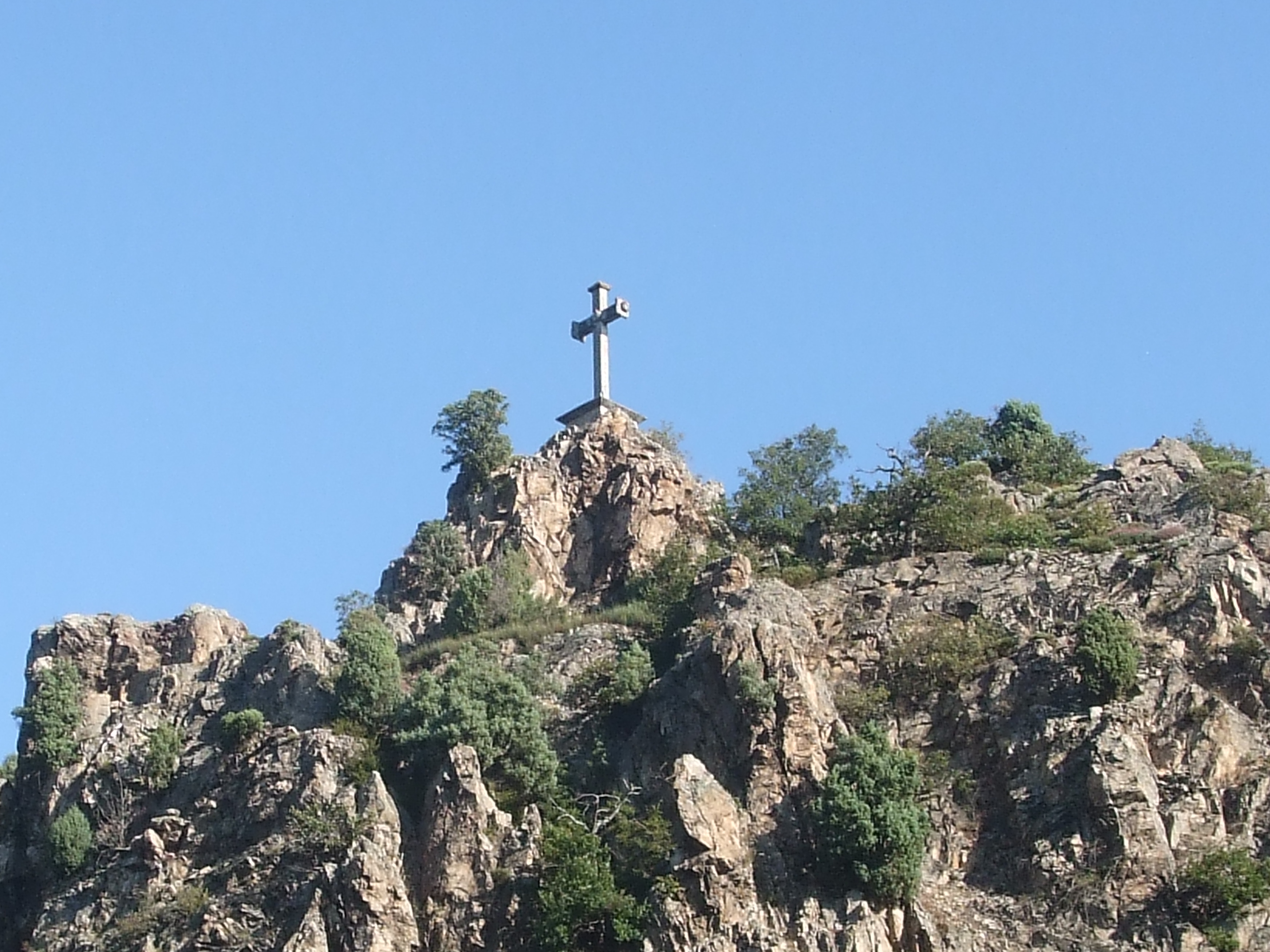
Calvary in the Ay Gorges between Sarras and Ardoix

- The Tower of Oriol
- The Chateau of Manoha
- The Chateau of Muñás
- The Oratory of Our Lady of Cormes
- The Church contains many items which are registered as historical objects:
  - The Rostrum Balustrade (19th century)
  - A Baptismal font (19th century)
  - 2 Confessionals (19th century)
  - A Crucifix (19th century)
  - A Pulpit with supports (19th century)
  - A Stations of the Cross (19th century)
  - 4 Statues and Commemorative Plaques (19th century)
  - Decor of the Chapel of the Virgin
  - Decor of the Chapel of the Sacred Heart

=== Ardoix Picture Gallery ===
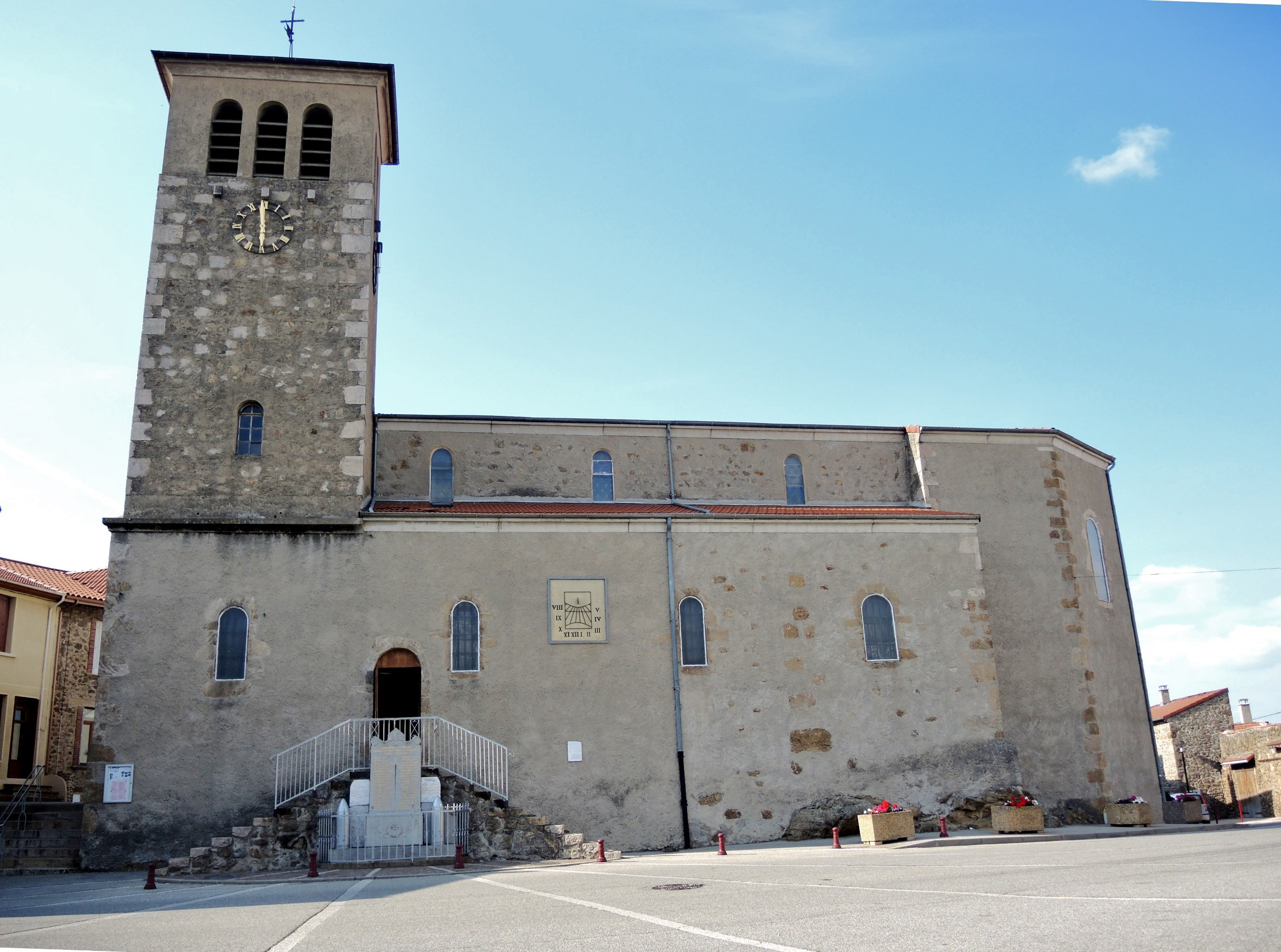
The Church

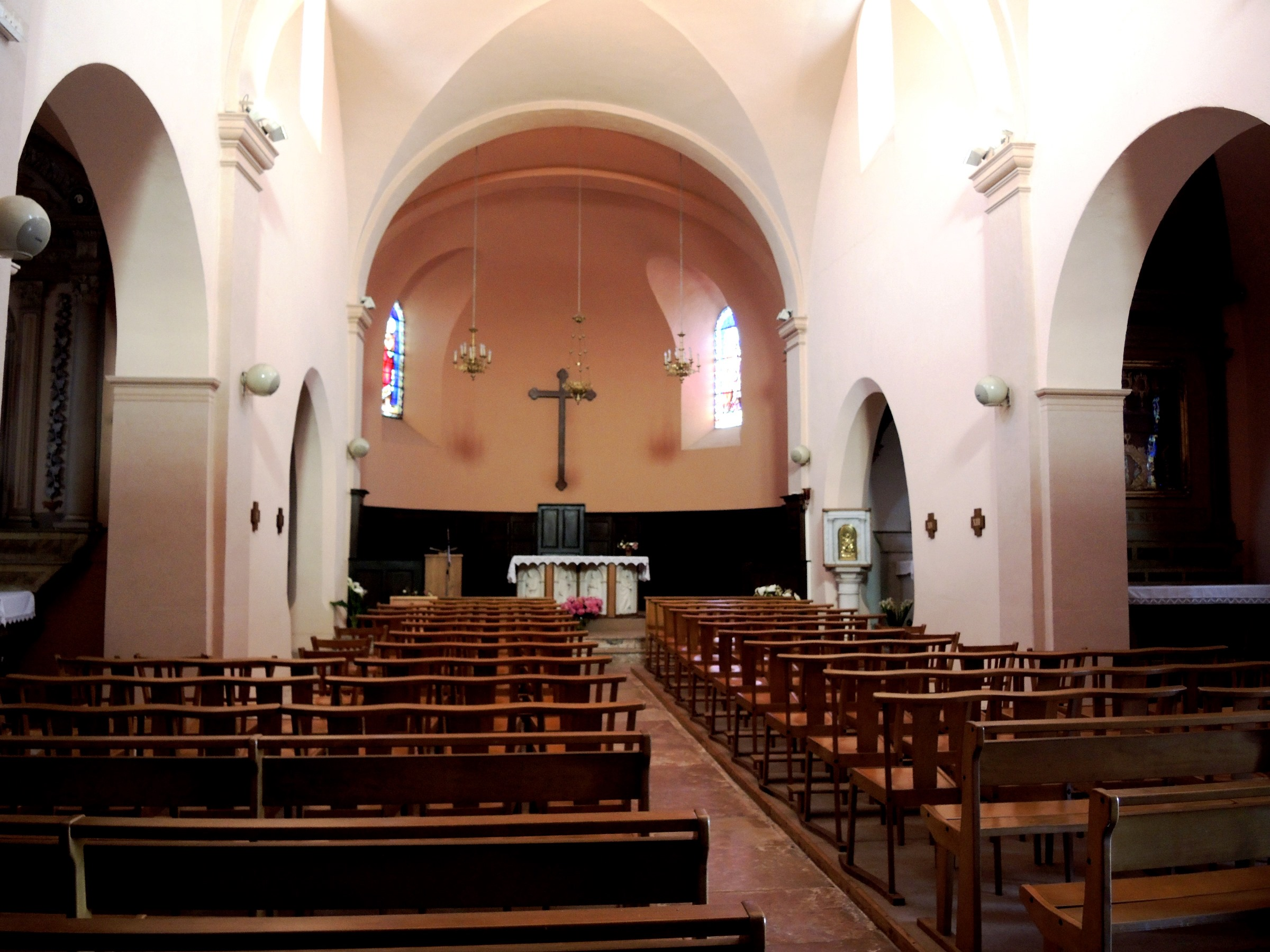
The Church interior

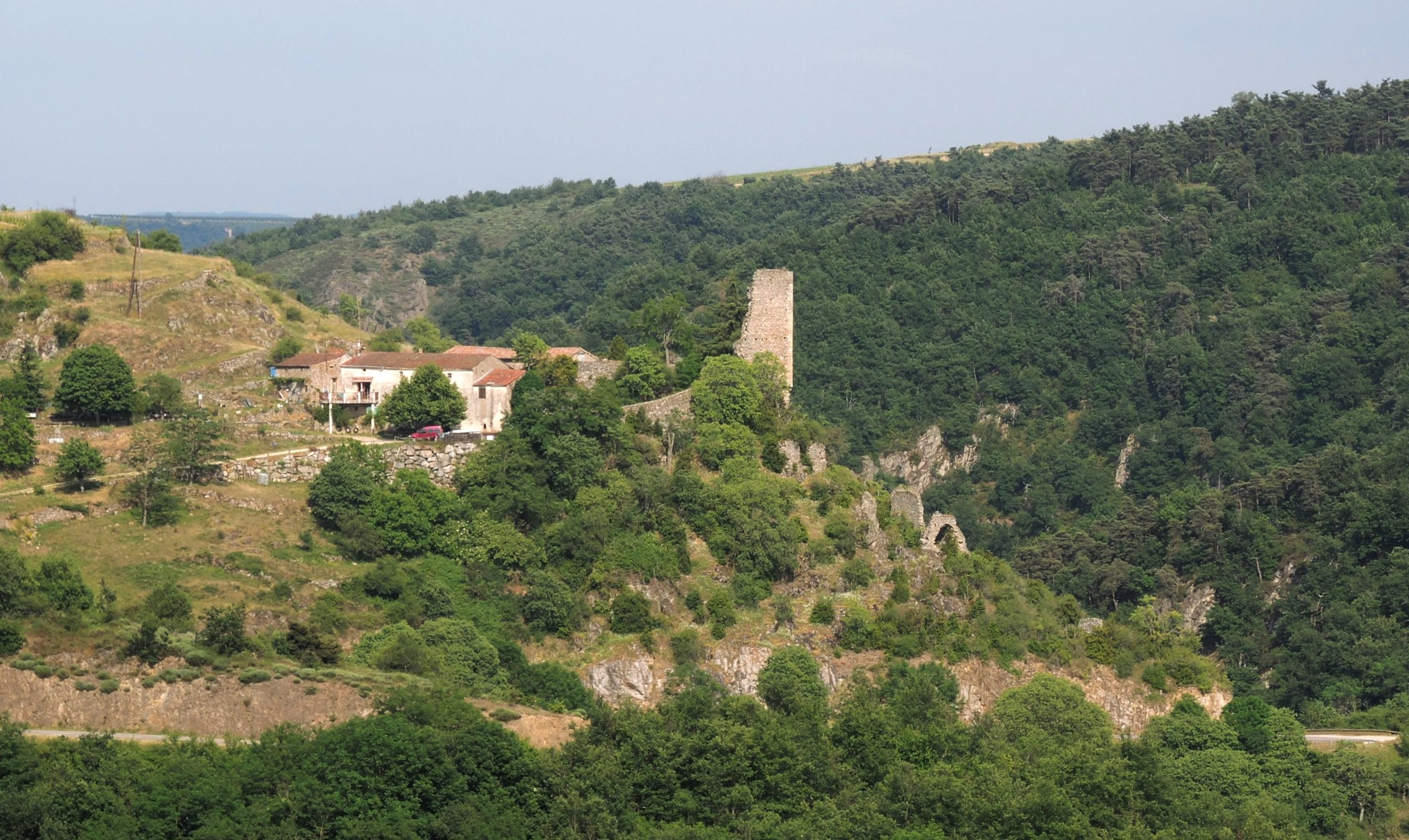
The Tower of Oriol

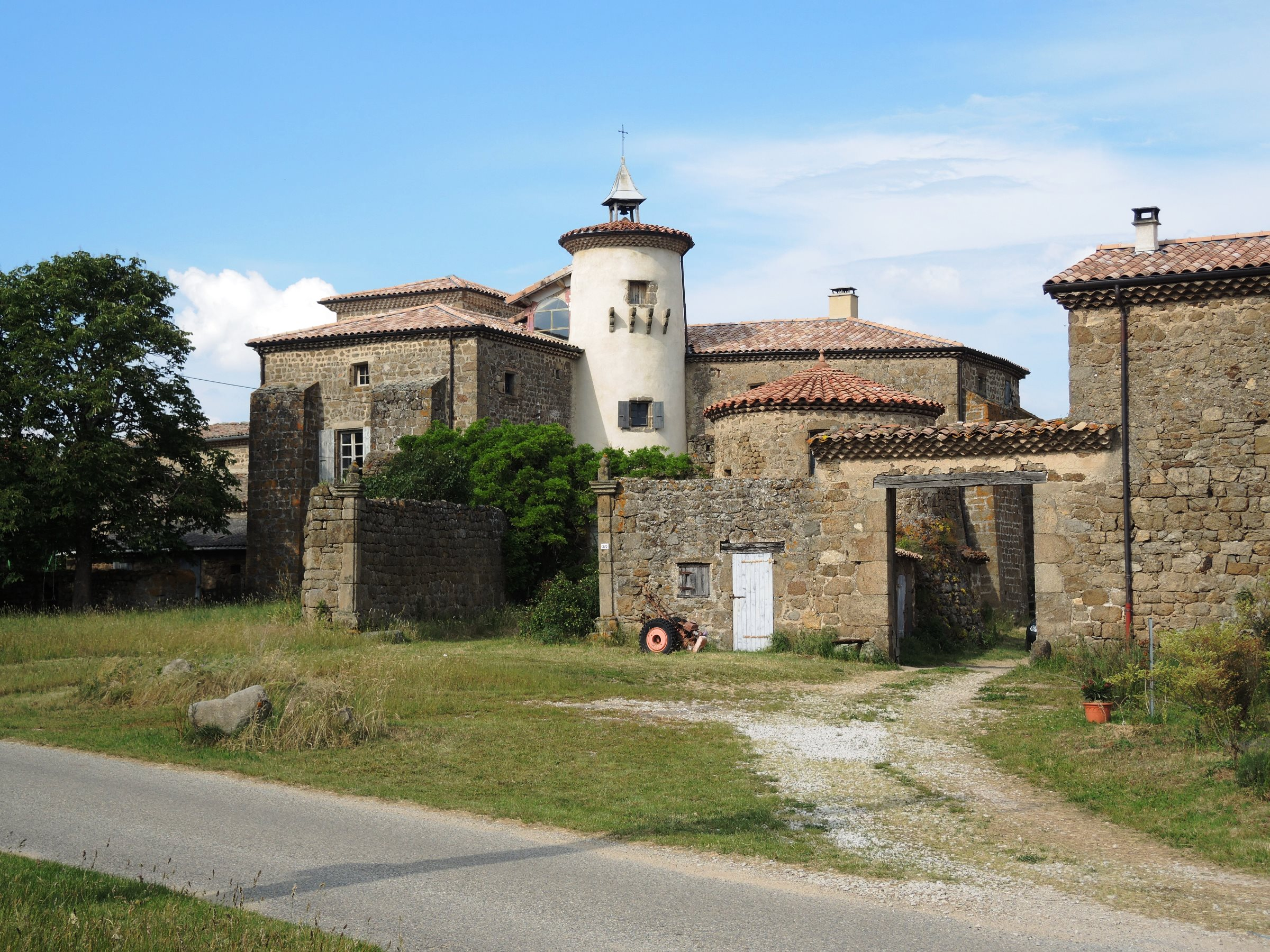
The Chateau of Manoha

== See also ==
- Communes of the Ardèche department
