= Arlebosc =

- Commune
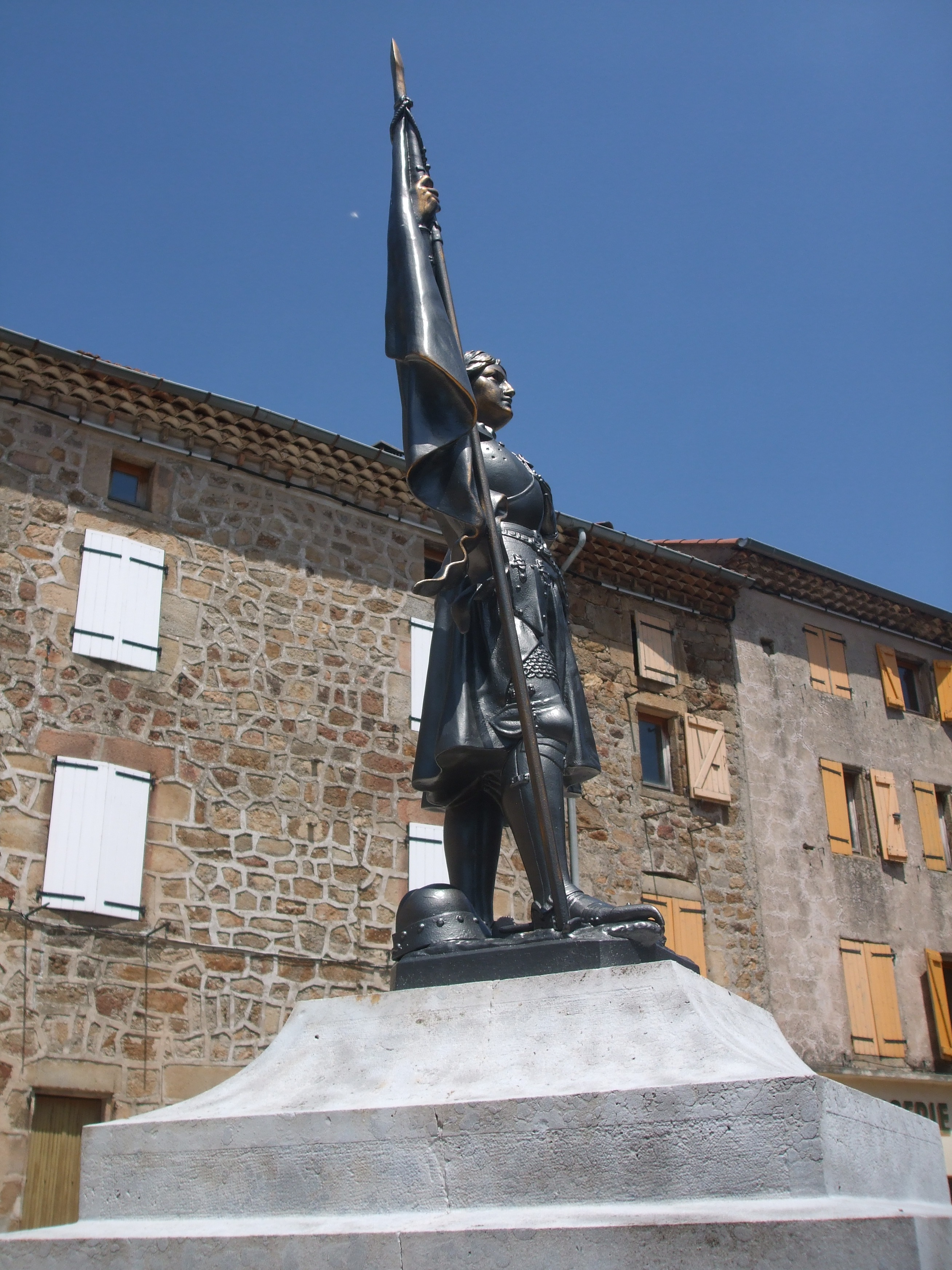
- Statue of Joan of Arc at Arlebosc
- Location of Arlebosc
- Location within France Location within Auvergne-Rhône-Alpes
- Coordinates: 45°02′14″N 4°39′07″E
- Country: France
- Region: Auvergne-Rhône-Alpes
- Department: Ardèche
- Arrondissement: Tournon-sur-Rhône
- Canton: Haut-Vivarais
- Intercommunality: CA Arche Agglo

Government
  - Mayor (2020–2026): Michel Gay
- Area^{1}: 12.35 km^{2} (4.77 sq mi)
- Elevation: 420 m (1,380 ft)
- Highest elevation: 1,028 m (3,373 ft)
- Lowest elevation: 265 m (869 ft)
- Population (2023): 380
  - Density: 31/km^{2} (80/sq mi)
- Time zone: UTC+01:00 (CET)
  - Summer (DST): UTC+02:00 (CEST)
- INSEE/Postal code: 07014 /07410
- ^{1} French Land Register data, which excludes lakes, ponds, glaciers > 1 km^{2} (0.386 sq mi or 247 acres) and river estuaries.

Arlebosc (French pronunciation: [aʁləbɔsk]; Occitan: Arlabòsc) is a commune in the Ardèche department in the Auvergne-Rhône-Alpes region of southern France.

== Geography ==
Arlebosc is located some 12 km west by south-west of Tournon-sur-Rhône and 8 km north-east of Lamastre. Access to the commune is by the D578 road from Saint-Jeure-d'Ay in the north passing through the village and continuing west then south-west to join the D534 north-west of Lamastre. Apart from the village there are the hamlets of Saint-Just in the north-east and Les Fauries in the western extension of the commune. The commune is rugged and heavily forested with some farmland on the eastern side.

The Doux river forms part of the south-western border and flows through the commune from south-west to north-east. The Ruisseau de Balaye forms the western border as it flows south to join the Doux. Other streams rise in the commune and flow south-east to join the Doux. The Merdenc rises in the north of the commune and forms part of the northern border as it flows north-east to join the Daronne south-east of Saint-Félicien.

== Toponymy ==
A legend attributes the name of the commune to one of its Lords: Bozon d'Arles.

In reality, it is a name from the Old French -bosc (a primitive form of bois meaning "wood") attested in the Occitan form of Arlabosc from 912 and Latinized to Allabosco in the 14th century.

Ernest Nègre explained the first element as an Occitan form erela meaning "cranberry". The French term for cranberry (Airelle) is considered to be a borrowing from a variant of the Massif Central or the Alpine éiréla (also airelo). The Provençal aire is also used for "cranberry", from the Latin ater meaning "black", d'où la signification globale de « bois des airelles ».3, so the overall meaning is "forest of cranberries".

== Administration ==
List of Successive Mayors

From	To	Name
1809		Jean-Baptiste Bouvet
1809	1816	Jean André Etienne-Peyrouze
1817		Jean Alexandre du Rouchet de Chazotte
1945	1954	Marius Sarzier
1954	1977	André Banchet
1977	1989	Michel Vert
1989	2008	Jean-Claude Deloche
2008	2020	Jean Paul Agier
2020	current	Michel Gay

== Demography ==
The inhabitants of the commune are known as Arleboscois or Arleboscoises in French.

Historical population

Year	Pop.	±% p.a.
1793	1,000	—
1800	784	−3.42%
1806	950	+3.25%
1821	971	+0.15%
1831	926	−0.47%
1836	1,035	+2.25%
1841	1,015	−0.39%
1846	1,020	+0.10%
1851	989	−0.62%
1856	1,042	+1.05%
1861	1,044	+0.04%
1866	1,050	+0.11%
1872	1,098	+0.75%
1876	1,103	+0.11%
1881	1,080	−0.42%
1886	1,074	−0.11%
1891	1,141	+1.22%
1896	1,033	−1.97%
1901	986	−0.93%

Year	Pop.	±% p.a.
1906	1,010	+0.48%
1911	896	−2.37%
1921	804	−1.08%
1926	739	−1.67%
1931	690	−1.36%
1936	668	−0.65%
1946	614	−0.84%
1954	534	−1.73%
1962	501	−0.79%
1968	479	−0.75%
1975	433	−1.43%
1982	378	−1.92%
1990	360	−0.61%
1999	321	−1.27%
2007	345	+0.91%
2012	336	−0.53%
2017	331	−0.30%
2023	380	+2.33%

Source: EHESS and INSEE

== Sites and Monuments ==
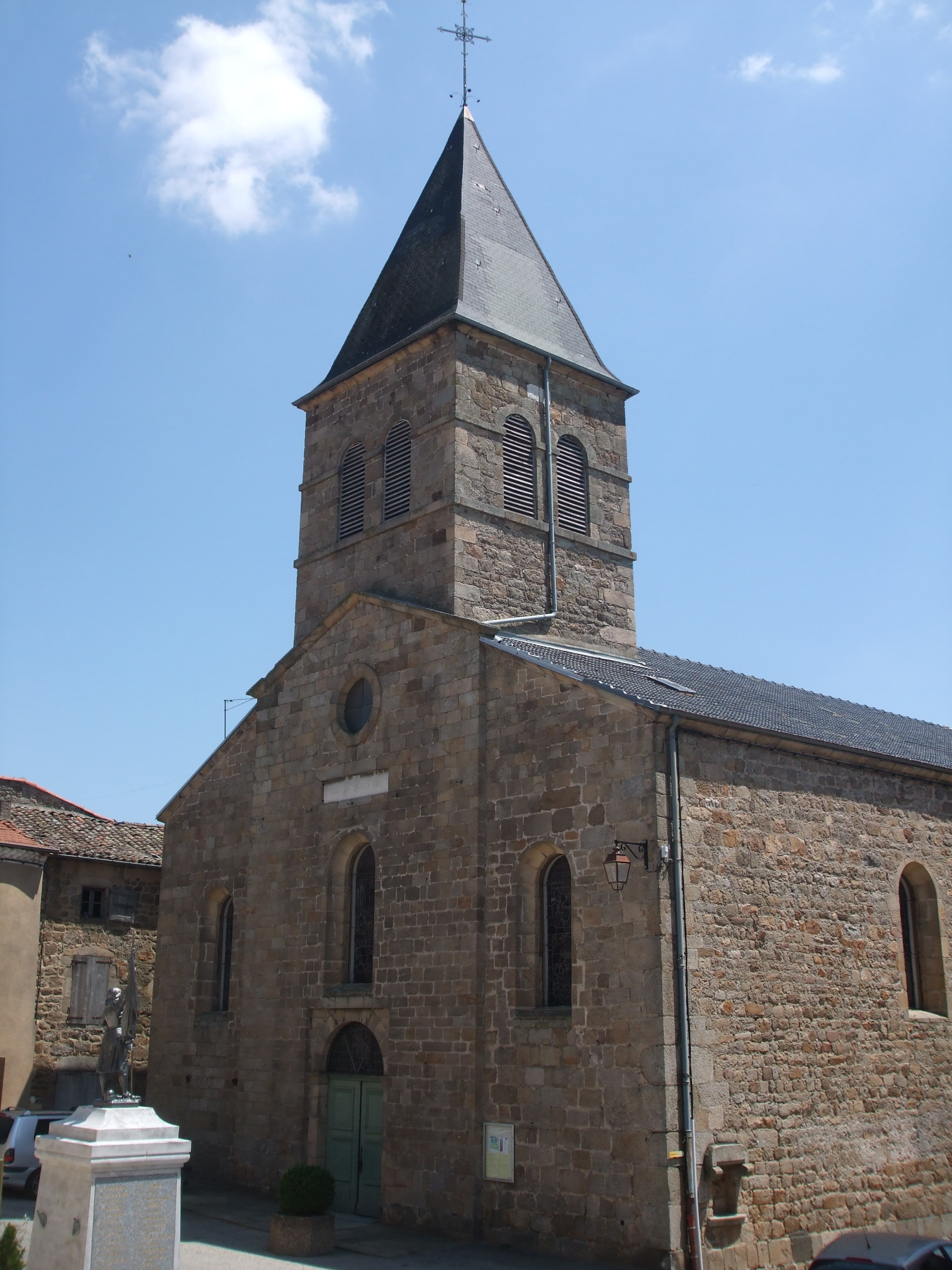
Church of Saint Sacrement at Arlebosc

- The Chateau of Chazotte (17th century) is registered as an historical monument.
- The Chateau of Malgaray
- The Chateau of Romaneaux
- The Church of Saint Sacrement from the 19th century. The church contains several items that are registered as historical objects:
  - 2 Statues: Torch-bearing Angels (18th century)
  - A Silk Cope (19th century)
  - A Group Sculpture: Crucifixion
  - A Ciborium (1657)
- The Chapel of Saint Just

=== Picture Gallery ===
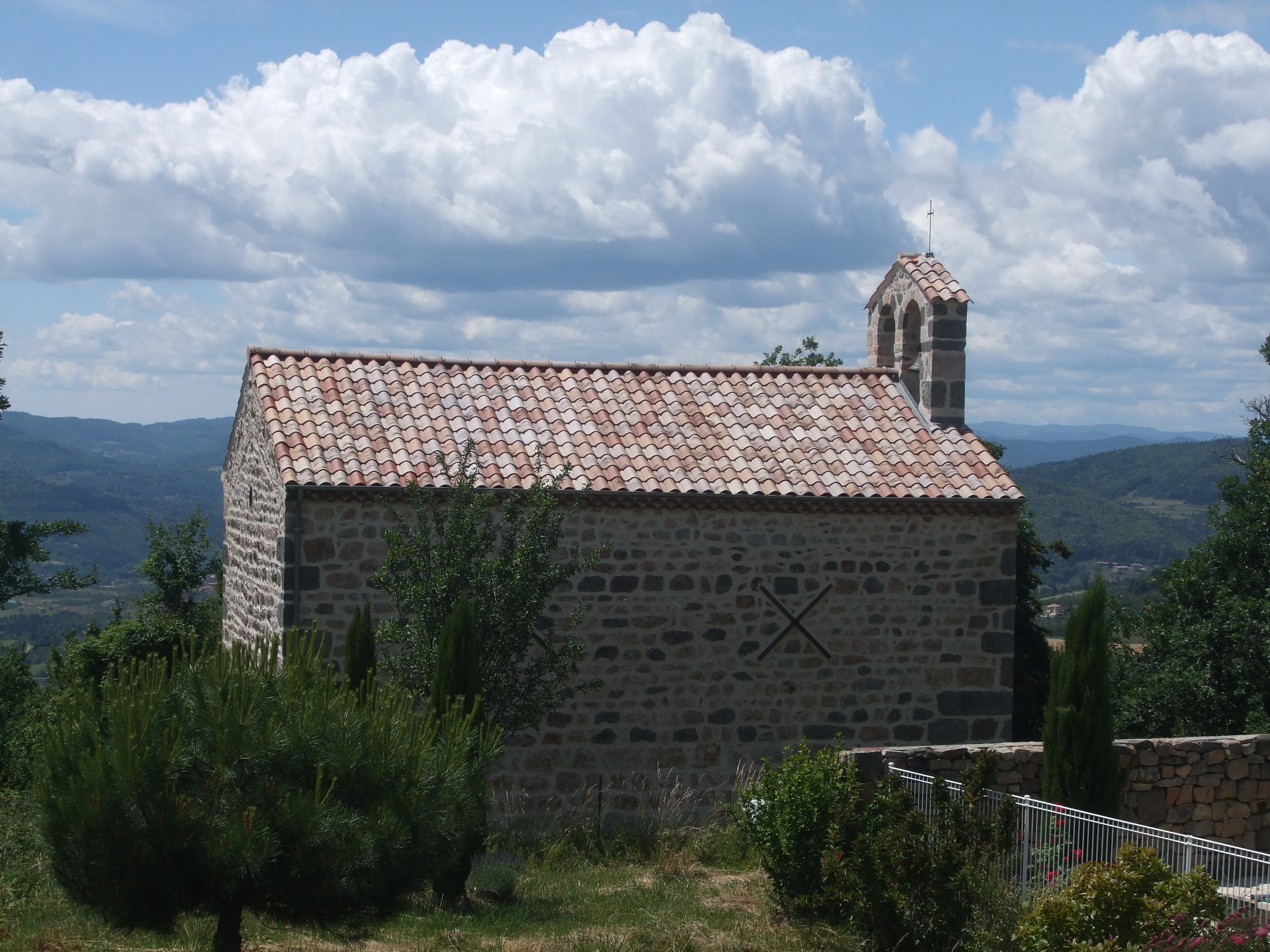
Chapel at Saint Just

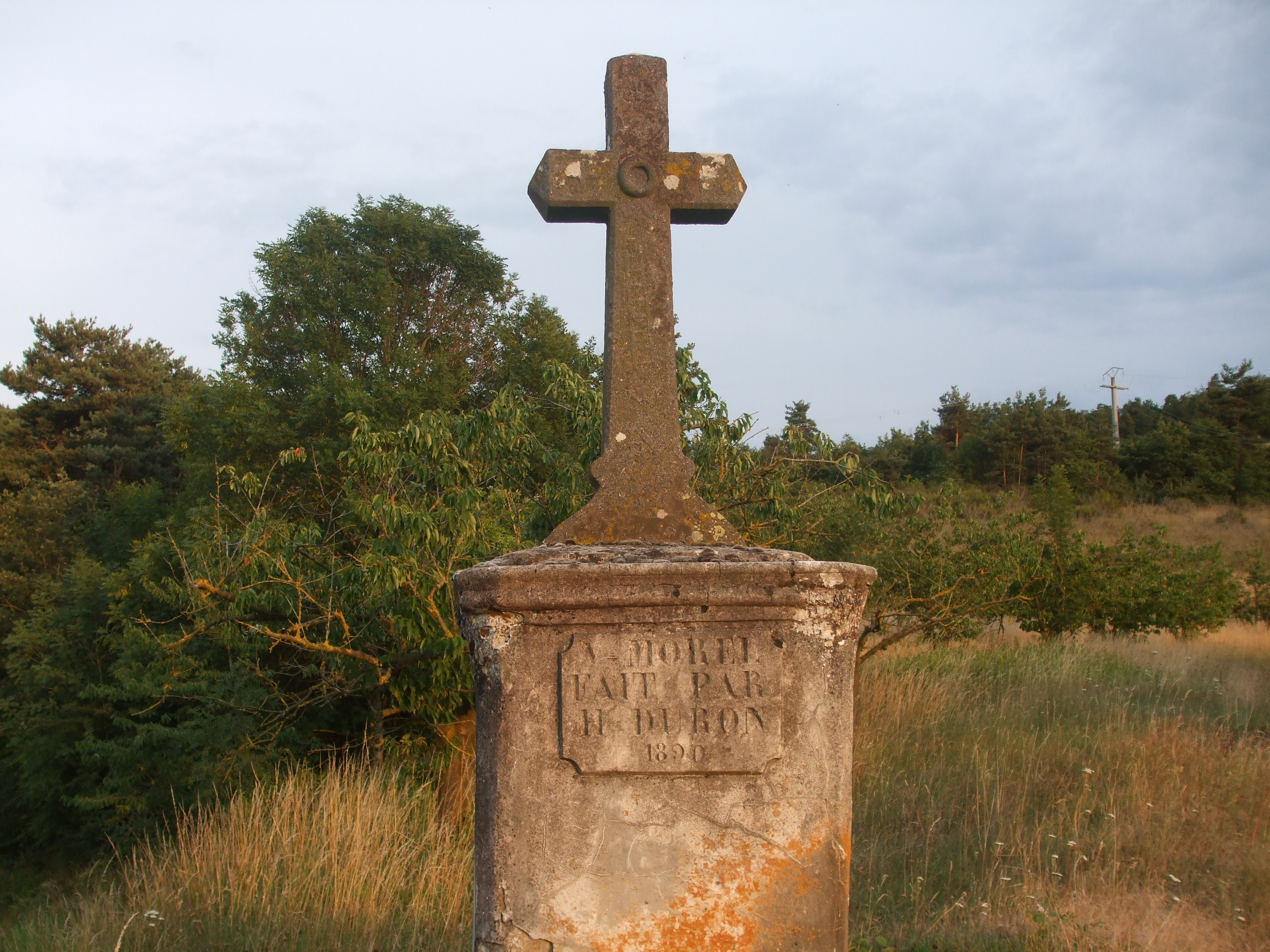
Tincey Cross from 1890

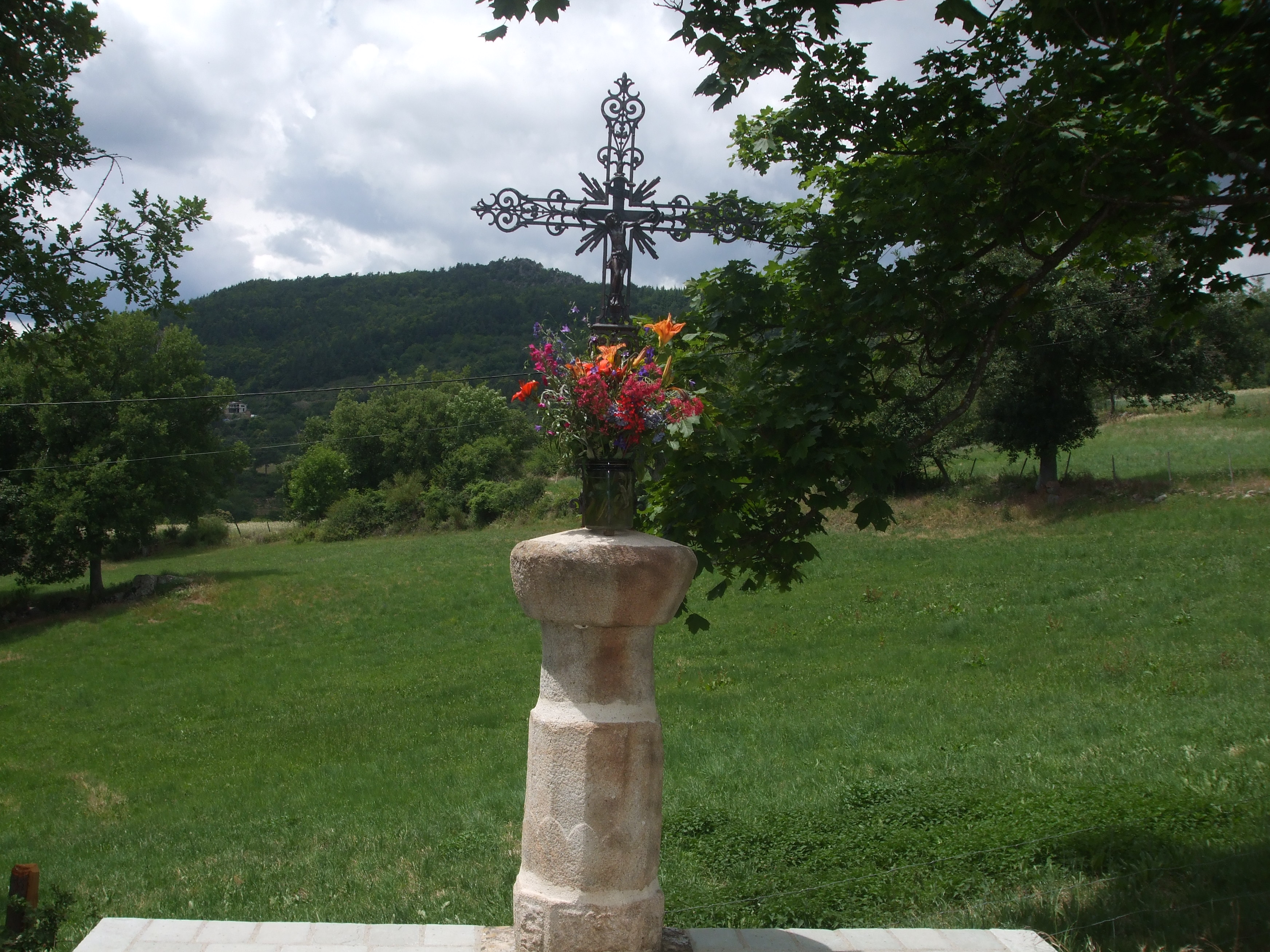
Cross in front of the Chapel at Saint Just

== Notable people linked to the commune ==
- Myriam Gagnaire, a presenter on France 3 and TV5 Monde on "Side gardens" is a resident of the commune and artistic director of http://www.lacompagnieduchatquilouche.fr, a cultural association whose headquarters is in Arlebosc and covers the Ardèche department with various cultural and educational activities in association with the local authorities.

== See also ==
- Communes of the Ardèche department
