= Saint-Pierre-sur-Doux =

- Commune
- Location of Saint-Pierre-sur-Doux
- Location within France Location within Auvergne-Rhône-Alpes
- Coordinates: 45°07′17″N 4°27′55″E
- Country: France
- Region: Auvergne-Rhône-Alpes
- Department: Ardèche
- Arrondissement: Tournon-sur-Rhône
- Canton: Haut-Vivarais
- Intercommunality: Val d'Ay

Government
  - Mayor (2020–2026): Sébastien Bouillot
- Area^{1}: 21.19 km^{2} (8.18 sq mi)
- Elevation: 880 m (2,890 ft)
- Highest elevation: 1,325 m (4,347 ft)
- Lowest elevation: 660 m (2,170 ft)
- Population (2023): 108
  - Density: 5.10/km^{2} (13.2/sq mi)
- Time zone: UTC+01:00 (CET)
  - Summer (DST): UTC+02:00 (CEST)
- INSEE/Postal code: 07285 /07520
- ^{1} French Land Register data, which excludes lakes, ponds, glaciers > 1 km^{2} (0.386 sq mi or 247 acres) and river estuaries.

Saint-Pierre-sur-Doux (French pronunciation: [sɛ̃ pjɛʁ syʁ du], literally Saint-Pierre on Doux; Vivaro-Alpine: Sant Pèire) is a commune in the Ardèche department in southern France. It lies on the river Doux.

== Population ==
Historical population
Year	Pop.	±% p.a.
1968	218	—
1975	169	−3.57%
1982	107	−6.32%
1990	98	−1.09%
1999	85	−1.57%
2007	101	+2.18%
2012	110	+1.72%
2017	107	−0.55%
2023	108	+0.16%
Source: INSEE

== See also ==
- Communes of the Ardèche department
