= Saint-Prix =

Saint-Prix may refer to the following places in France:

- Saint-Prix, Allier, a commune in the department of Allier
- Saint-Prix, Ardèche, a commune in the department of Ardèche
- Saint-Prix, Saône-et-Loire, a commune in the department of Saône-et-Loire
- Saint-Prix, Val-d'Oise, a commune in the department of Val-d'Oise
- Saint-Prix-lès-Arnay, a commune in the department of Côte-d'Or
- Talus-Saint-Prix, a commune in the department of Marne

Saint-Prix may also refer to:

- Saint-Prix (Bishop of Clermont) (625–676)
- Prætextatus (Bishop of Rouen) (died 586), a sixth-century saint also known as Saint Prix
- Saint-Prix, an 18th-century/19th-century French actor
