= Nozières =

Nozières may refer to the following places in France:

- Nozières, Ardèche, a commune in the department of Ardèche
- Nozières, Cher, a commune in the department of Cher
