= Bozas =

- Commune
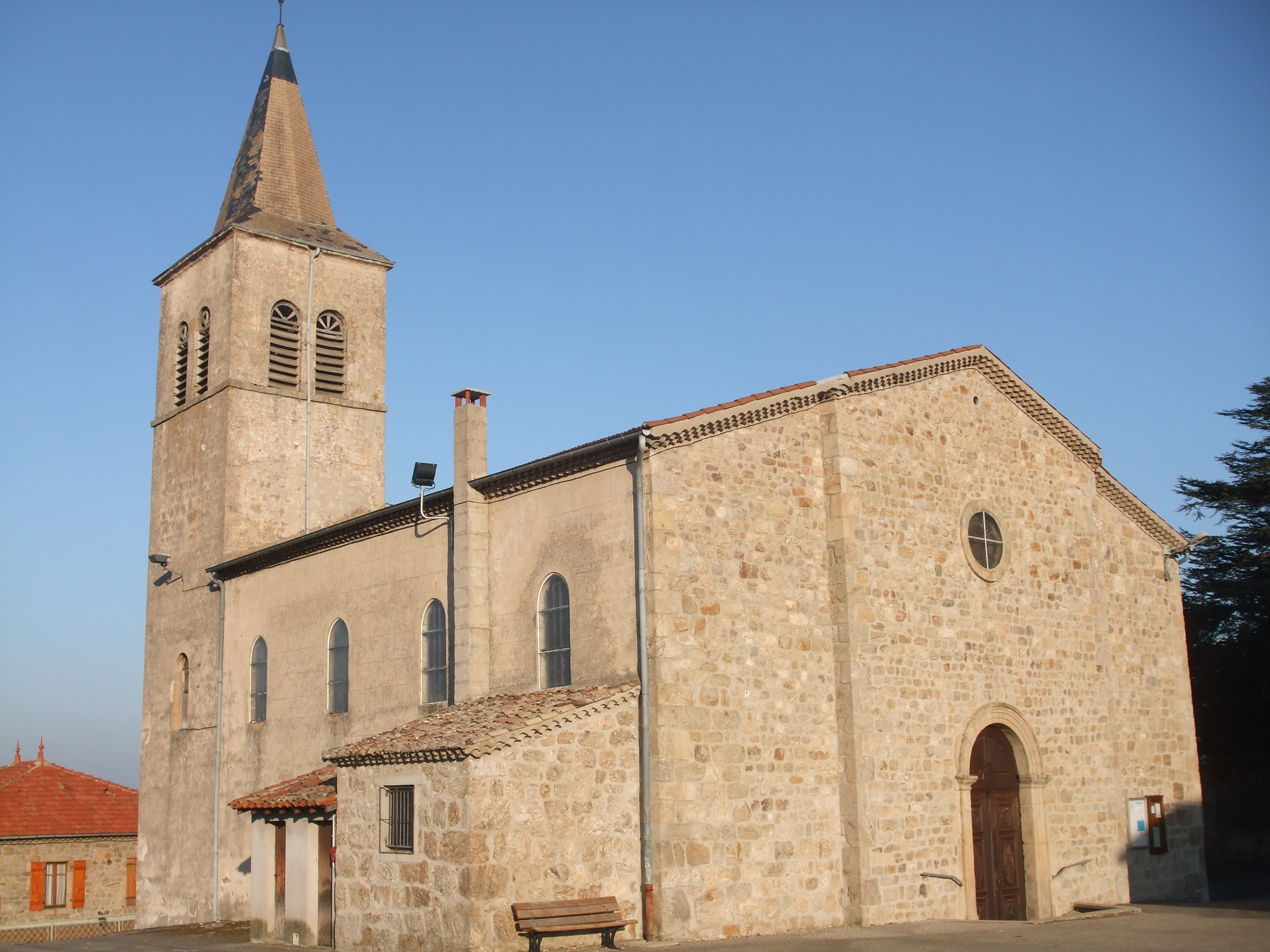
- The church in Bozas
- Location of Bozas
- Location within France Location within Auvergne-Rhône-Alpes
- Coordinates: 45°03′21″N 4°39′06″E
- Country: France
- Region: Auvergne-Rhône-Alpes
- Department: Ardèche
- Arrondissement: Tournon-sur-Rhône
- Canton: Haut-Vivarais
- Intercommunality: CA Arche Agglo

Government
  - Mayor (2020–2026): Jean-Louis Wiart
- Area^{1}: 12.5 km^{2} (4.8 sq mi)
- Elevation: 500 m (1,600 ft)
- Highest elevation: 808 m (2,651 ft)
- Lowest elevation: 277 m (909 ft)
- Population (2023): 255
  - Density: 20.4/km^{2} (52.8/sq mi)
- Time zone: UTC+01:00 (CET)
  - Summer (DST): UTC+02:00 (CEST)
- INSEE/Postal code: 07039 /07410
- ^{1} French Land Register data, which excludes lakes, ponds, glaciers > 1 km^{2} (0.386 sq mi or 247 acres) and river estuaries.

Bozas (before 1985: Bosas) is a commune in the Ardèche department in southern France.

== Population ==
Historical population
| Year | Pop. | ±% p.a. |
|---|---|---|
| 1968 | 380 | — |
| 1975 | 302 | −3.23% |
| 1982 | 281 | −1.02% |
| 1990 | 233 | −2.31% |
| 1999 | 244 | +0.51% |
| 2007 | 244 | +0.00% |
| 2012 | 248 | +0.33% |
| 2017 | 245 | −0.24% |
| 2023 | 255 | +0.67% |
Source: INSEE

== See also ==
- Communes of the Ardèche department
