= Saint-Victor, Ardèche =

Saint-Victor
- Commune
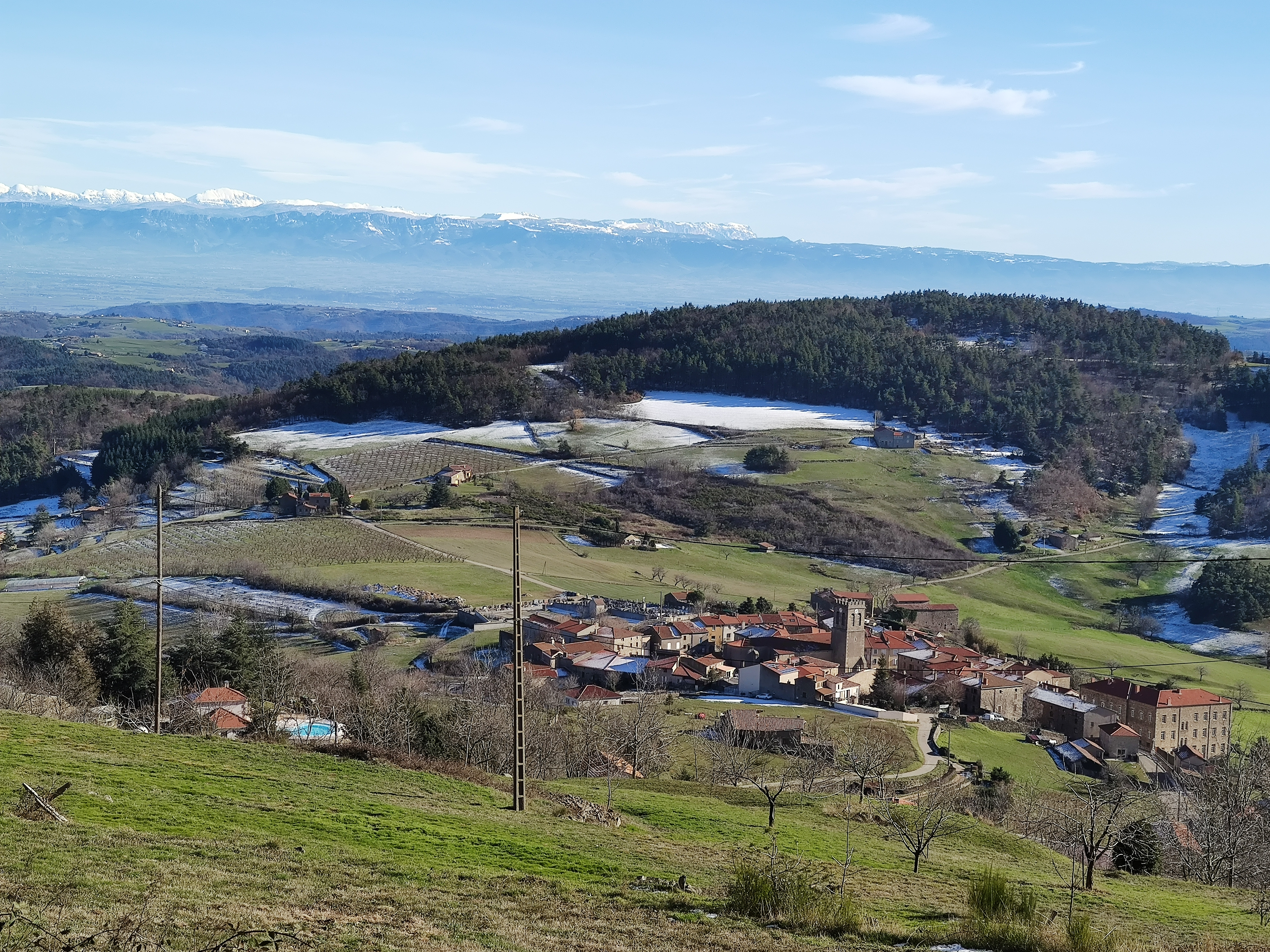
- Town hall
- Location of Saint-Victor
- Location within France Location within Auvergne-Rhône-Alpes
- Coordinates: 45°06′06″N 4°40′23″E
- Country: France
- Region: Auvergne-Rhône-Alpes
- Department: Ardèche
- Arrondissement: Tournon-sur-Rhône
- Canton: Haut-Vivarais
- Intercommunality: CA Arche Agglo

Government
  - Mayor (2020–2026): Alain Mesbah-Savel
- Area^{1}: 31.88 km^{2} (12.31 sq mi)
- Elevation: 620 m (2,030 ft)
- Highest elevation: 881 m (2,890 ft)
- Lowest elevation: 240 m (790 ft)
- Population (2023): 968
  - Density: 30.4/km^{2} (78.6/sq mi)
- Time zone: UTC+01:00 (CET)
  - Summer (DST): UTC+02:00 (CEST)
- INSEE/Postal code: 07301 /07410
- ^{1} French Land Register data, which excludes lakes, ponds, glaciers > 1 km^{2} (0.386 sq mi or 247 acres) and river estuaries.

Saint-Victor (French pronunciation: [sɛ̃ viktɔʁ]; Vivaro-Alpine: Sant Victor) is a commune in the Ardèche department in southern France.

== Population ==
Historical population
Year	Pop.	±% p.a.
1968	917	—
1975	777	−2.34%
1982	796	+0.35%
1990	821	+0.39%
1999	828	+0.09%
2007	929	+1.45%
2012	951	+0.47%
2017	949	−0.04%
2023	968	+0.33%
Source: INSEE

== See also ==
- Communes of the Ardèche department
