= Saint-Sylvestre, Ardèche =

Saint-Sylvestre
- Commune
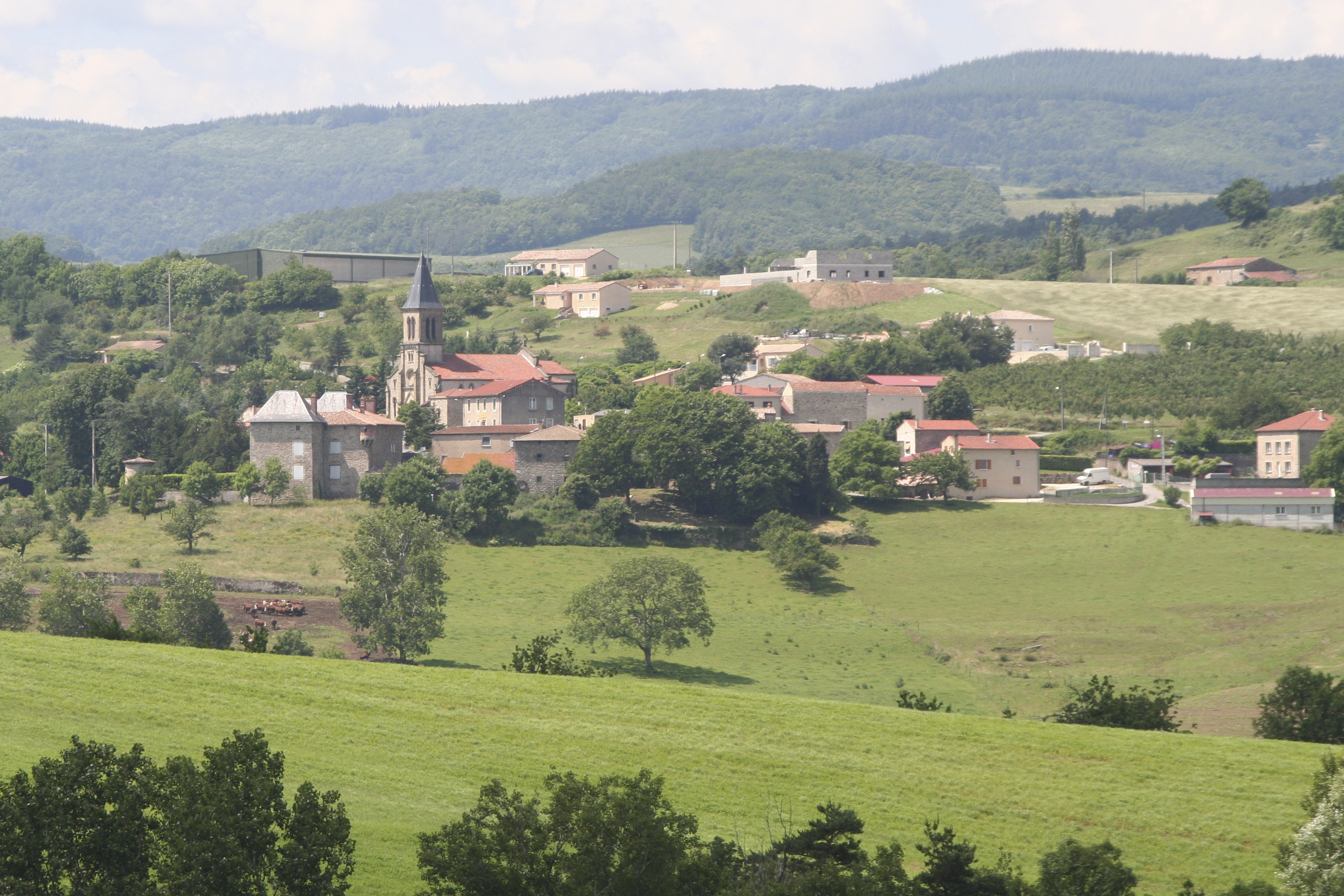
- A general view of Saint-Sylvestre
- Location of Saint-Sylvestre
- Location within France Location within Auvergne-Rhône-Alpes
- Coordinates: 44°59′26″N 4°44′57″E
- Country: France
- Region: Auvergne-Rhône-Alpes
- Department: Ardèche
- Arrondissement: Tournon-sur-Rhône
- Canton: Haut-Vivarais

Government
  - Mayor (2020–2026): Laëtitia Goumat
- Area^{1}: 15.16 km^{2} (5.85 sq mi)
- Elevation: 420 m (1,380 ft)
- Highest elevation: 627 m (2,057 ft)
- Lowest elevation: 305 m (1,001 ft)
- Population (2023): 513
  - Density: 33.8/km^{2} (87.6/sq mi)
- Time zone: UTC+01:00 (CET)
  - Summer (DST): UTC+02:00 (CEST)
- INSEE/Postal code: 07297 /07440
- ^{1} French Land Register data, which excludes lakes, ponds, glaciers > 1 km^{2} (0.386 sq mi or 247 acres) and river estuaries.

Saint-Sylvestre (French pronunciation: [sɛ̃ silvɛstʁ]; Vivaro-Alpine: Sant Silvèstre) is a commune in the Ardèche department in southern France.

== Population ==
Historical population
Year	Pop.	±% p.a.
1968	475	—
1975	385	−2.96%
1982	363	−0.84%
1990	334	−1.04%
1999	350	+0.52%
2007	461	+3.50%
2012	497	+1.52%
2017	508	+0.44%
2023	513	+0.16%
Source: INSEE

== See also ==
- Communes of the Ardèche department
