= Empurany =

- Commune
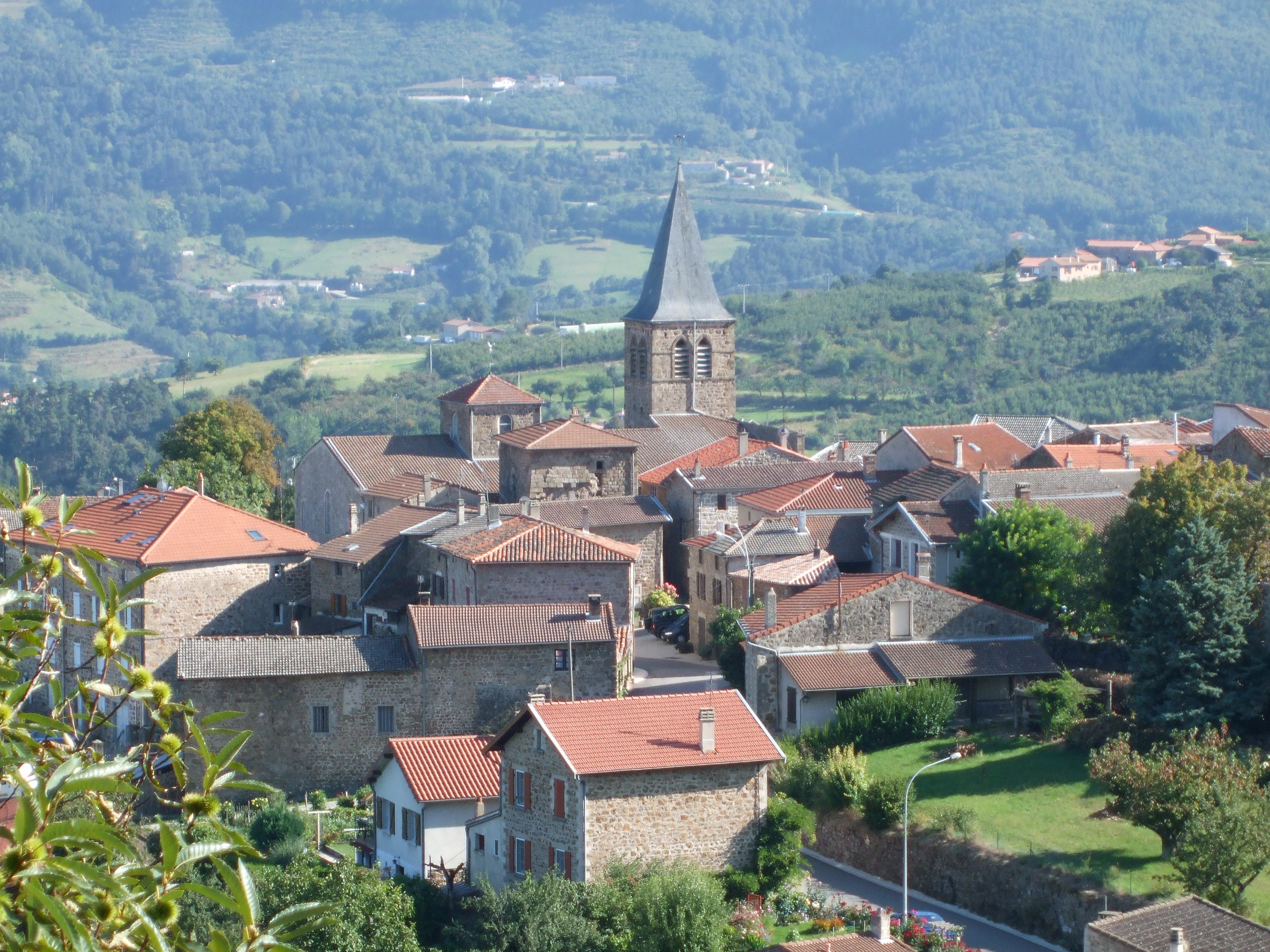
- The church and surroundings in Empurany

- Coat of arms
- Location of Empurany
- Location within France Location within Auvergne-Rhône-Alpes
- Coordinates: 45°01′31″N 4°36′34″E
- Country: France
- Region: Auvergne-Rhône-Alpes
- Department: Ardèche
- Arrondissement: Tournon-sur-Rhône
- Canton: Haut-Vivarais

Government
  - Mayor (2020–2026): Denis Glaizol
- Area^{1}: 18.94 km^{2} (7.31 sq mi)
- Elevation: 500 m (1,600 ft)
- Highest elevation: 1,028 m (3,373 ft)
- Lowest elevation: 310 m (1,020 ft)
- Population (2023): 571
  - Density: 30.1/km^{2} (78.1/sq mi)
- Time zone: UTC+01:00 (CET)
  - Summer (DST): UTC+02:00 (CEST)
- INSEE/Postal code: 07085 /07270
- ^{1} French Land Register data, which excludes lakes, ponds, glaciers > 1 km^{2} (0.386 sq mi or 247 acres) and river estuaries.

Empurany is a commune in the Ardèche department in southern France.

== Population ==
Historical population
Year	Pop.	±% p.a.
1968	770	—
1975	696	−1.43%
1982	631	−1.39%
1990	546	−1.79%
1999	492	−1.15%
2007	538	+1.12%
2012	553	+0.55%
2017	598	+1.58%
2023	571	−0.77%
Source: INSEE

== See also ==
- Communes of the Ardèche department
