= Canton of Haut-Vivarais =

Coordinates: 44.99°N 4.58°E

- Canton
- Situation of the canton of Haut-Vivarais in the department of Ardèche
- Country: France
- Region: Auvergne-Rhône-Alpes
- Department: Ardèche
- No. of communes: {{{nbcomm}}}
- Population (2023): 21,827
- INSEE code: 0708

The canton of Haut-Vivarais (before 2016: canton of Lamastre) is an administrative division of the Ardèche department, southern France. Its borders were modified at the French canton reorganisation which came into effect in March 2015. Its seat is in Lamastre.

It consists of the following communes:

1. Alboussière
2. Ardoix
3. Arlebosc
4. Bozas
5. Champis
6. Colombier-le-Vieux
7. Le Crestet
8. Désaignes
9. Empurany
10. Gilhoc-sur-Ormèze
11. Labatie-d'Andaure
12. Lafarre
13. Lalouvesc
14. Lamastre
15. Nozières
16. Pailharès
17. Préaux
18. Quintenas
19. Saint-Alban-d'Ay
20. Saint-Barthélemy-Grozon
21. Saint-Basile
22. Saint-Félicien
23. Saint-Jeure-d'Ay
24. Saint-Pierre-sur-Doux
25. Saint-Prix
26. Saint-Romain-d'Ay
27. Saint-Sylvestre
28. Saint-Symphorien-de-Mahun
29. Saint-Victor
30. Satillieu
31. Vaudevant
