= Le Crestet =

- Commune
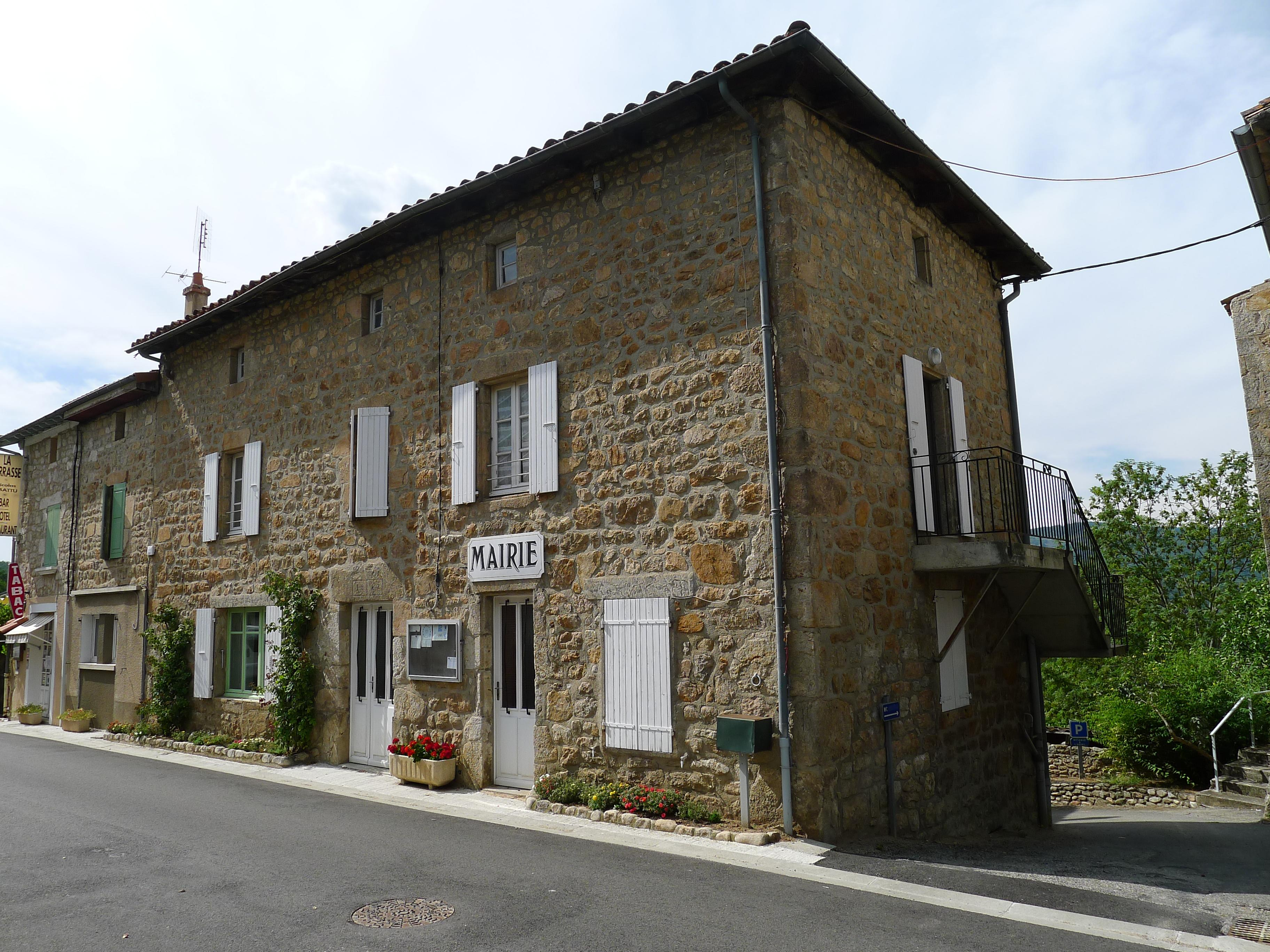
- Town hall
- Location of Le Crestet
- Location within France Location within Auvergne-Rhône-Alpes
- Coordinates: 45°00′55″N 4°39′20″E
- Country: France
- Region: Auvergne-Rhône-Alpes
- Department: Ardèche
- Arrondissement: Tournon-sur-Rhône
- Canton: Haut-Vivarais
- Intercommunality: Pays de Lamastre

Government
  - Mayor (2020–2026): Marie-Laure Blanc
- Area^{1}: 9.91 km^{2} (3.83 sq mi)
- Elevation: 470 m (1,540 ft)
- Highest elevation: 846 m (2,776 ft)
- Lowest elevation: 290 m (950 ft)
- Population (2023): 518
  - Density: 52.3/km^{2} (135/sq mi)
- Time zone: UTC+01:00 (CET)
  - Summer (DST): UTC+02:00 (CEST)
- INSEE/Postal code: 07073 /07270
- ^{1} French Land Register data, which excludes lakes, ponds, glaciers > 1 km^{2} (0.386 sq mi or 247 acres) and river estuaries.

Le Crestet (French pronunciation: [lə kʁɛstɛ]; Occitan: Lo Crestet) is a commune in the Ardèche department in southern France.

== Population ==
Historical population
Year	Pop.	±% p.a.
1968	415	—
1975	405	−0.35%
1982	436	+1.06%
1990	515	+2.10%
1999	510	−0.11%
2007	533	+0.55%
2012	534	+0.04%
2017	519	−0.57%
2023	518	−0.03%
Source: INSEE

== See also ==
- Communes of the Ardèche department
