= Quintenas =

- Commune
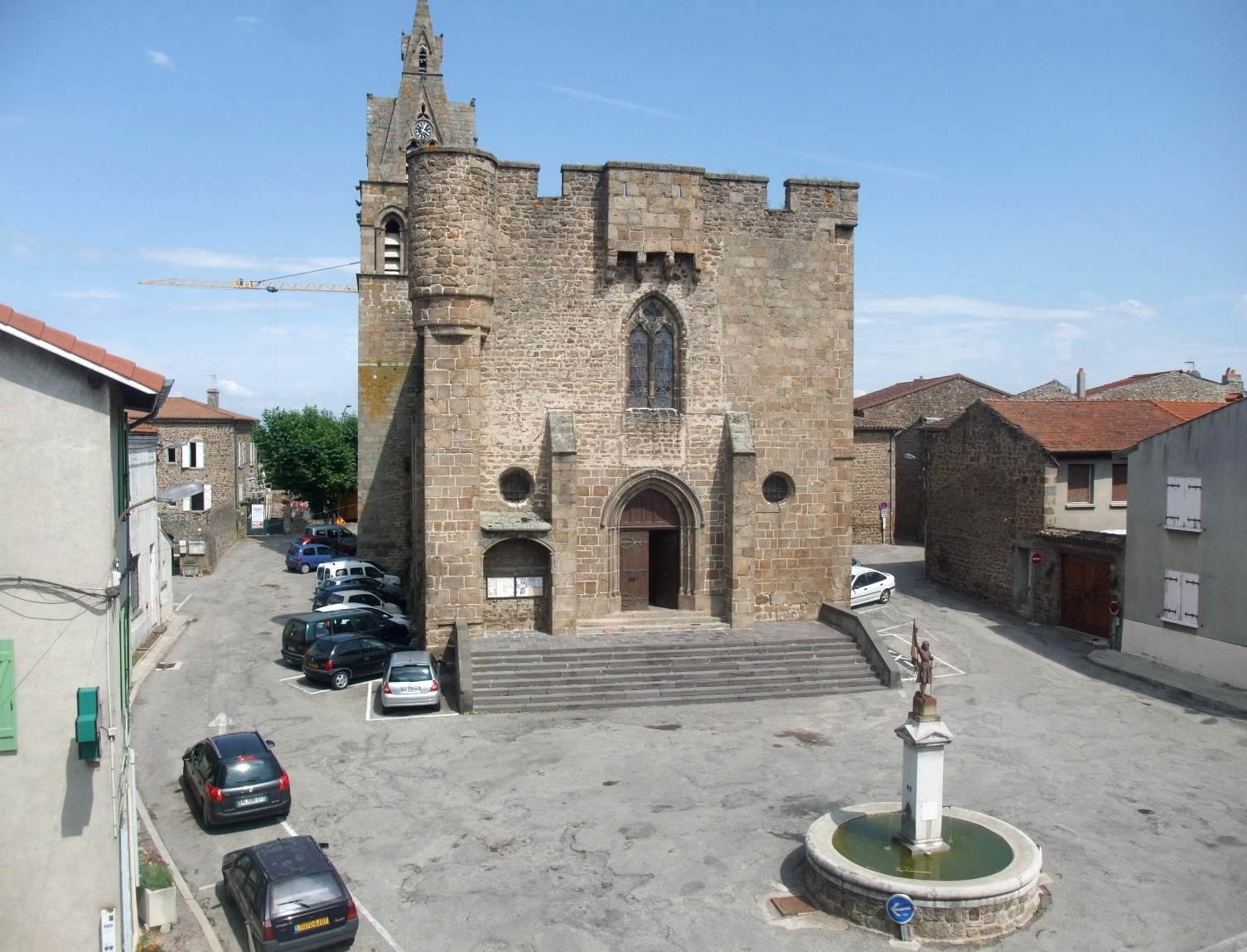
- The 14th century fortified church in Quintenas
- Location of Quintenas
- Location within France Location within Auvergne-Rhône-Alpes
- Coordinates: 45°11′23″N 4°41′18″E
- Country: France
- Region: Auvergne-Rhône-Alpes
- Department: Ardèche
- Arrondissement: Tournon-sur-Rhône
- Canton: Haut-Vivarais
- Intercommunality: Annonay Rhône Agglo

Government
  - Mayor (2025–2026): Nathalie Dufaud
- Area^{1}: 14 km^{2} (5.4 sq mi)
- Elevation: 350 m (1,150 ft)
- Highest elevation: 435 m (1,427 ft)
- Lowest elevation: 200 m (660 ft)
- Population (2023): 1,770
  - Density: 130/km^{2} (330/sq mi)
- Time zone: UTC+01:00 (CET)
  - Summer (DST): UTC+02:00 (CEST)
- INSEE/Postal code: 07188 /07290
- ^{1} French Land Register data, which excludes lakes, ponds, glaciers > 1 km^{2} (0.386 sq mi or 247 acres) and river estuaries.

Quintenas (French pronunciation: [kɛ̃tna]; Occitan: Quintenàs) is a commune in the Ardèche department in southern France.

== Population ==
Historical population
Year	Pop.	±% p.a.
1968	814	—
1975	914	+1.67%
1982	1,184	+3.77%
1990	1,278	+0.96%
1999	1,254	−0.21%
2007	1,379	+1.19%
2012	1,474	+1.34%
2017	1,630	+2.03%
2023	1,770	+1.38%
Source: INSEE

== See also ==
- Communes of the Ardèche department
