= Nozières, Ardèche =

Nozières
- Commune
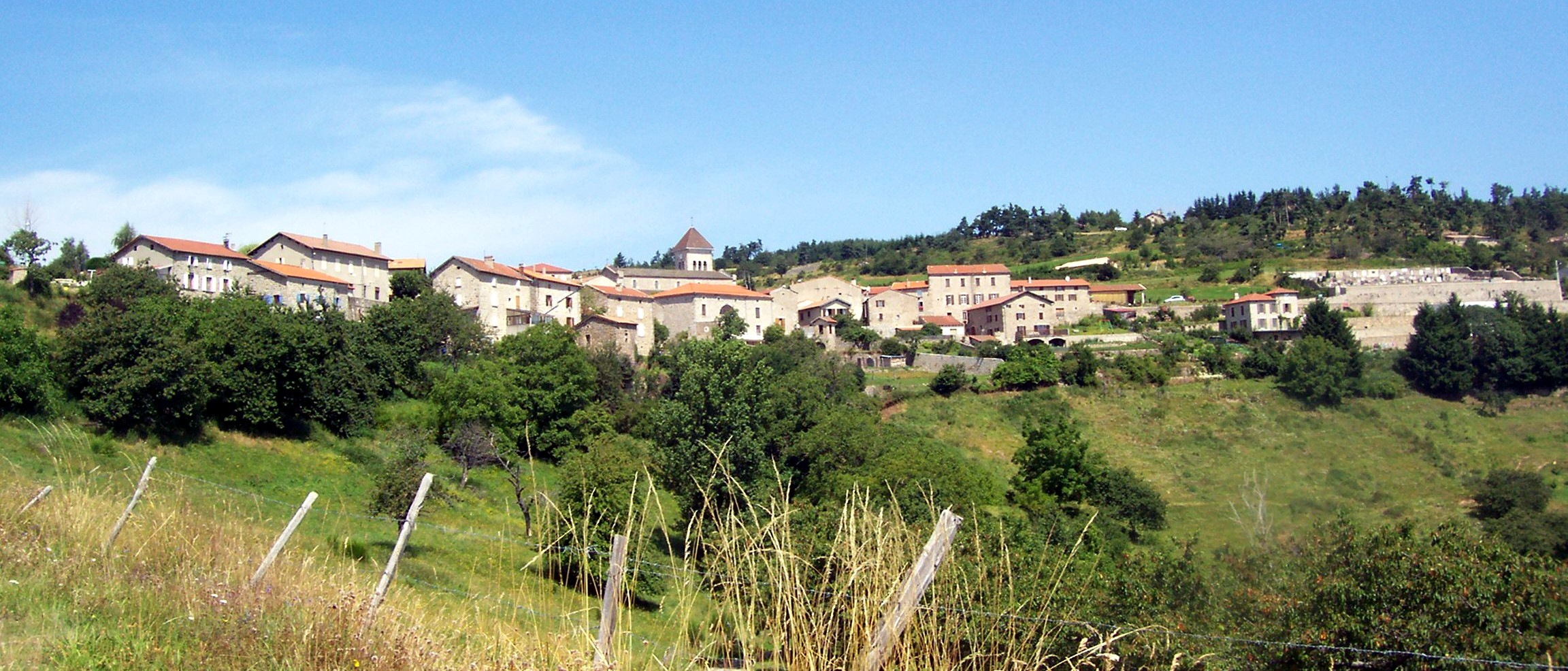
- A panorama of the village
- Location of Nozières
- Location within France Location within Auvergne-Rhône-Alpes
- Coordinates: 45°01′46″N 4°32′40″E
- Country: France
- Region: Auvergne-Rhône-Alpes
- Department: Ardèche
- Arrondissement: Tournon-sur-Rhône
- Canton: Haut-Vivarais

Government
  - Mayor (2020–2026): Bernadette Coste
- Area^{1}: 21.79 km^{2} (8.41 sq mi)
- Elevation: 920 m (3,020 ft)
- Highest elevation: 1,061 m (3,481 ft)
- Lowest elevation: 471 m (1,545 ft)
- Population (2023): 237
  - Density: 10.9/km^{2} (28.2/sq mi)
- Time zone: UTC+01:00 (CET)
  - Summer (DST): UTC+02:00 (CEST)
- INSEE/Postal code: 07166 /07270
- ^{1} French Land Register data, which excludes lakes, ponds, glaciers > 1 km^{2} (0.386 sq mi or 247 acres) and river estuaries.

Nozières (French pronunciation: [nozjɛʁ]) is a commune in the Ardèche department in southern France.

== Population ==
Historical population
Year	Pop.	±% p.a.
1968	492	—
1975	413	−2.47%
1982	349	−2.38%
1990	300	−1.87%
1999	258	−1.66%
2007	246	−0.59%
2012	273	+2.10%
2017	258	−1.12%
2023	237	−1.41%
Source: INSEE

== See also ==
- Communes of the Ardèche department
