= Saint-Prix, Ardèche =

Saint-Prix
- Commune
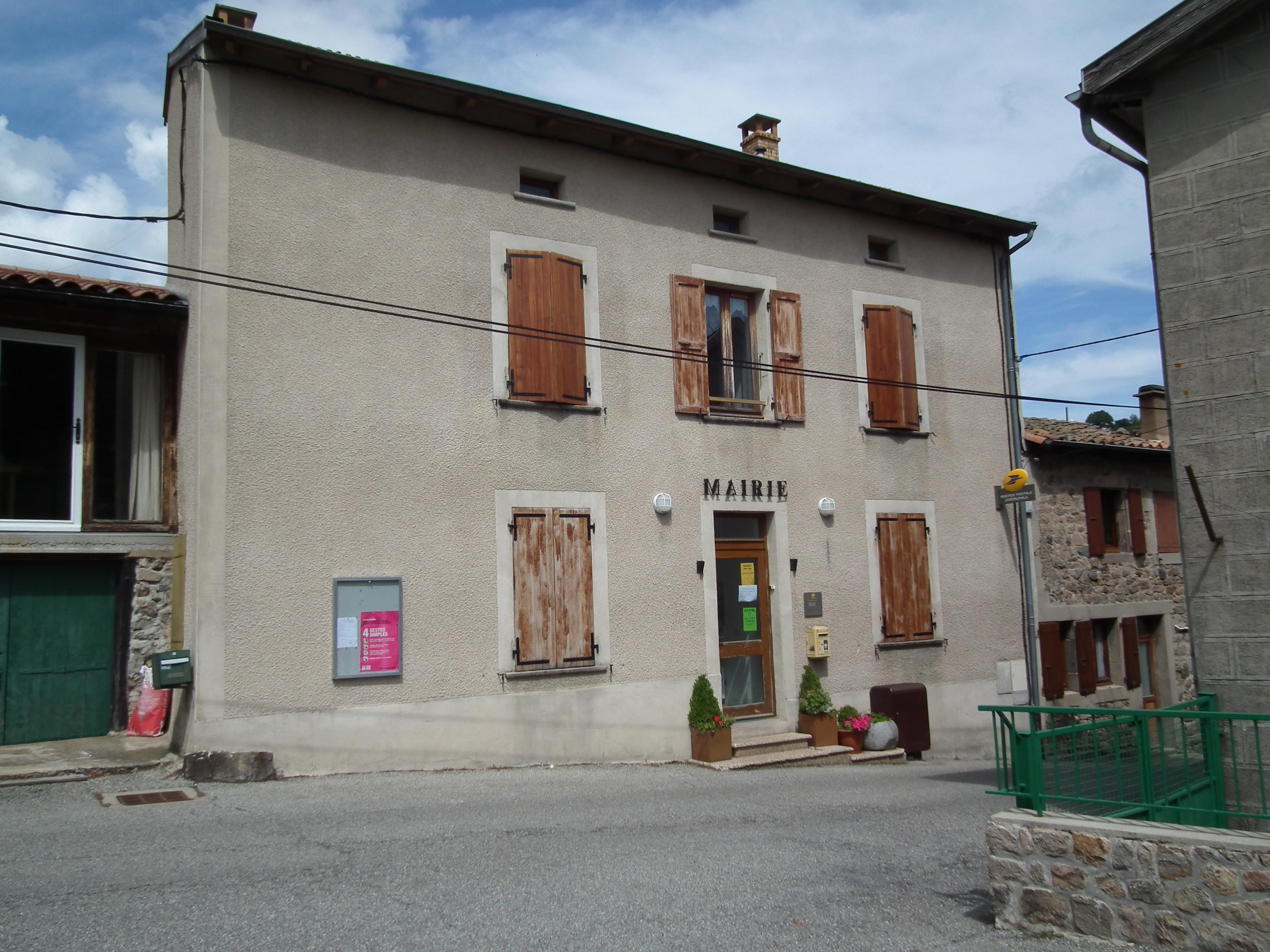
- Town hall
- Location of Saint-Prix
- Location within France Location within Auvergne-Rhône-Alpes
- Coordinates: 44°56′37″N 4°30′05″E
- Country: France
- Region: Auvergne-Rhône-Alpes
- Department: Ardèche
- Arrondissement: Tournon-sur-Rhône
- Canton: Haut-Vivarais

Government
  - Mayor (2020–2026): Max Gauchier
- Area^{1}: 15.21 km^{2} (5.87 sq mi)
- Elevation: 550 m (1,800 ft)
- Highest elevation: 1,046 m (3,432 ft)
- Lowest elevation: 465 m (1,526 ft)
- Population (2023): 269
  - Density: 17.7/km^{2} (45.8/sq mi)
- Time zone: UTC+01:00 (CET)
  - Summer (DST): UTC+02:00 (CEST)
- INSEE/Postal code: 07290 /07270
- ^{1} French Land Register data, which excludes lakes, ponds, glaciers > 1 km^{2} (0.386 sq mi or 247 acres) and river estuaries.

Saint-Prix (French pronunciation: [sɛ̃ pʁi]; Vivaro-Alpine: Sent Prech) is a commune in the Ardèche department in southern France.

== Population ==
Historical population
Year	Pop.	±% p.a.
1968	417	—
1975	344	−2.71%
1982	277	−3.05%
1990	221	−2.78%
1999	250	+1.38%
2007	253	+0.15%
2012	261	+0.62%
2017	276	+1.12%
2023	269	−0.43%
Source: INSEE

== See also ==
- Communes of the Ardèche department
