= Vaudevant =

- Commune
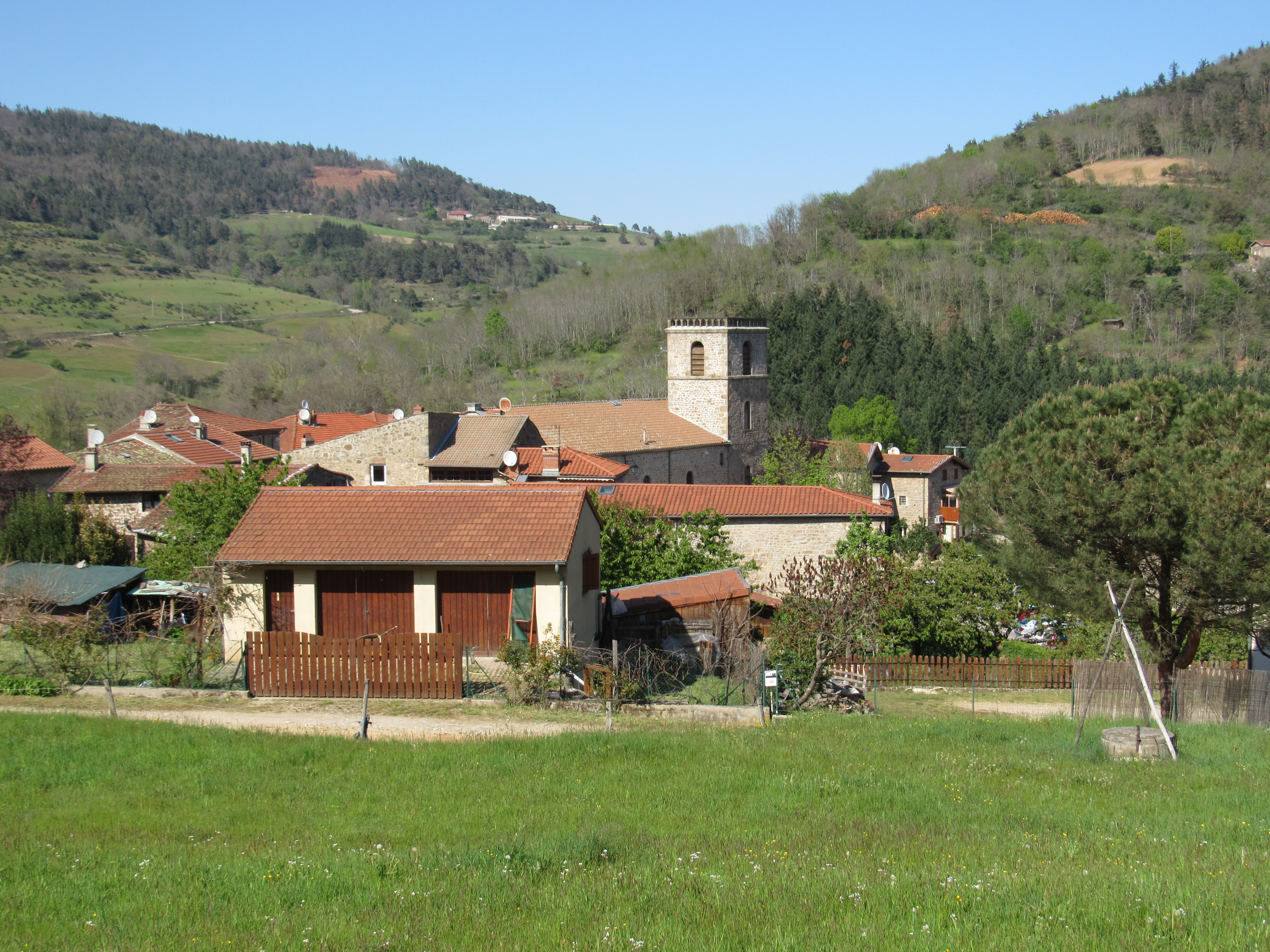
- Location of Vaudevant
- Location within France Location within Auvergne-Rhône-Alpes
- Coordinates: 45°06′15″N 4°37′11″E
- Country: France
- Region: Auvergne-Rhône-Alpes
- Department: Ardèche
- Arrondissement: Tournon-sur-Rhône
- Canton: Haut-Vivarais
- Intercommunality: CA Arche Agglo

Government
  - Mayor (2020–2026): Laetitia Bourjat
- Area^{1}: 12.46 km^{2} (4.81 sq mi)
- Elevation: 597 m (1,959 ft)
- Highest elevation: 1,061 m (3,481 ft)
- Lowest elevation: 500 m (1,600 ft)
- Population (2023): 223
  - Density: 17.9/km^{2} (46.4/sq mi)
- Time zone: UTC+01:00 (CET)
  - Summer (DST): UTC+02:00 (CEST)
- INSEE/Postal code: 07335 /07410
- ^{1} French Land Register data, which excludes lakes, ponds, glaciers > 1 km^{2} (0.386 sq mi or 247 acres) and river estuaries.

Vaudevant (French pronunciation: [vodvɑ̃]; Occitan: Vaudavent) is a commune in the Ardèche department in southern France.

== Population ==
Historical population
Year	Pop.	±% p.a.
1968	254	—
1975	202	−3.22%
1982	198	−0.29%
1990	216	+1.09%
1999	197	−1.02%
2007	211	+0.86%
2012	197	−1.36%
2017	205	+0.80%
2023	223	+1.41%
Source: INSEE

== See also ==
- Communes of the Ardèche department
