= Saint-Symphorien-de-Mahun =

- Commune
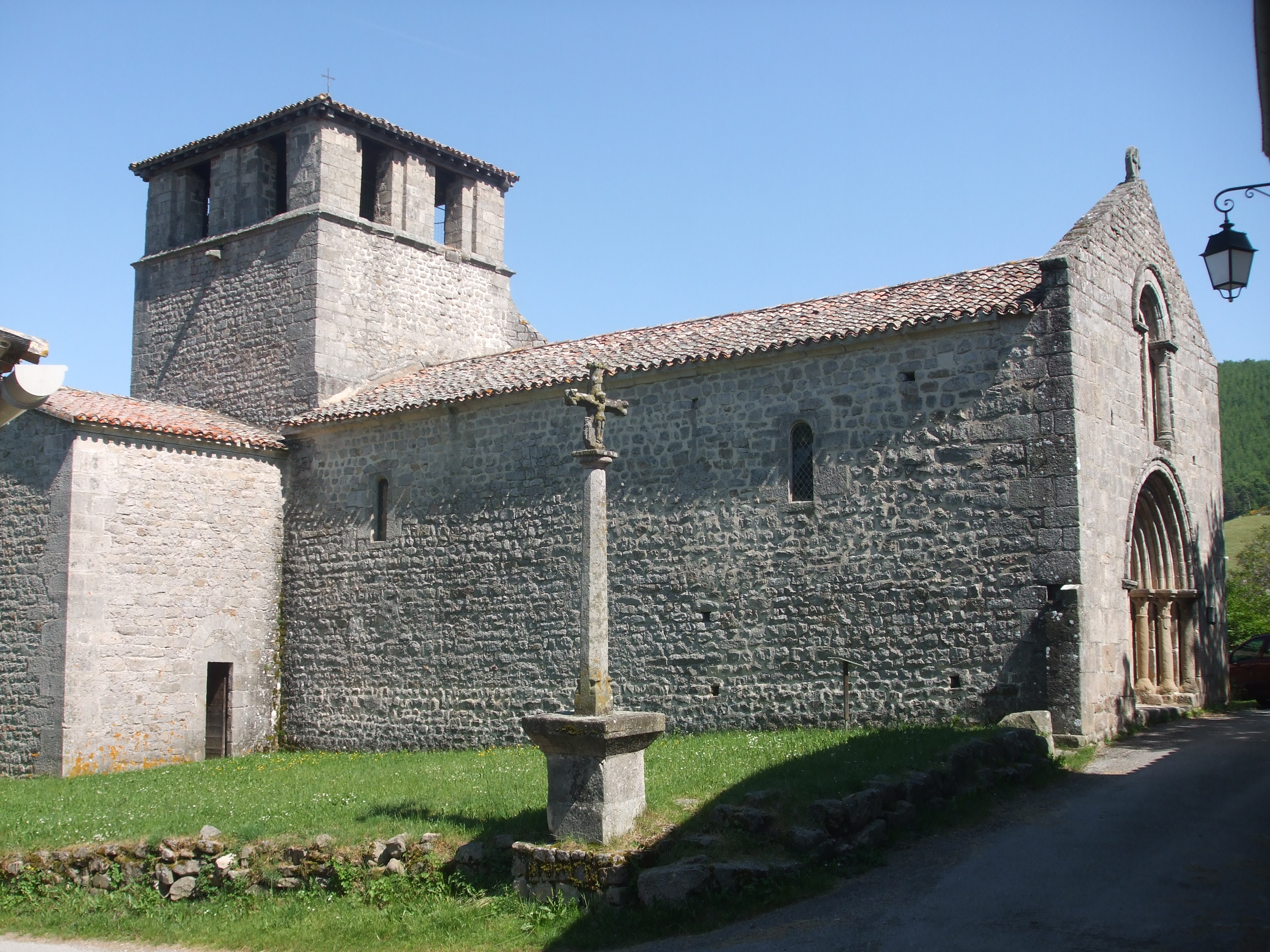
- The church in the hamlet of Veyrines, in Saint-Symphorien-de-Mahun
- Location of Saint-Symphorien-de-Mahun
- Location within France Location within Auvergne-Rhône-Alpes
- Coordinates: 45°09′54″N 4°33′39″E
- Country: France
- Region: Auvergne-Rhône-Alpes
- Department: Ardèche
- Arrondissement: Tournon-sur-Rhône
- Canton: Haut-Vivarais
- Intercommunality: Val d'Ay

Government
  - Mayor (2020–2026): Xavier Balandrau
- Area^{1}: 19.32 km^{2} (7.46 sq mi)
- Elevation: 675 m (2,215 ft)
- Highest elevation: 1,286 m (4,219 ft)
- Lowest elevation: 539 m (1,768 ft)
- Population (2023): 116
  - Density: 6.00/km^{2} (15.6/sq mi)
- Time zone: UTC+01:00 (CET)
  - Summer (DST): UTC+02:00 (CEST)
- INSEE/Postal code: 07299 /07290
- ^{1} French Land Register data, which excludes lakes, ponds, glaciers > 1 km^{2} (0.386 sq mi or 247 acres) and river estuaries.

Saint-Symphorien-de-Mahun (French pronunciation: [sɛ̃ sɛ̃fɔʁjɛ̃ də maœ̃]; Occitan: Sant Safloriá) is a commune in the Ardèche department in southern France.

== Population ==
Historical population
| Year | Pop. | ±% p.a. |
|---|---|---|
| 1968 | 254 | — |
| 1975 | 197 | −3.57% |
| 1982 | 174 | −1.76% |
| 1990 | 150 | −1.84% |
| 1999 | 131 | −1.49% |
| 2007 | 129 | −0.19% |
| 2012 | 143 | +2.08% |
| 2017 | 120 | −3.45% |
| 2023 | 116 | −0.56% |
Source: INSEE

== See also ==
- Communes of the Ardèche department
