= Lafarre, Ardèche =

Lafarre
- Commune
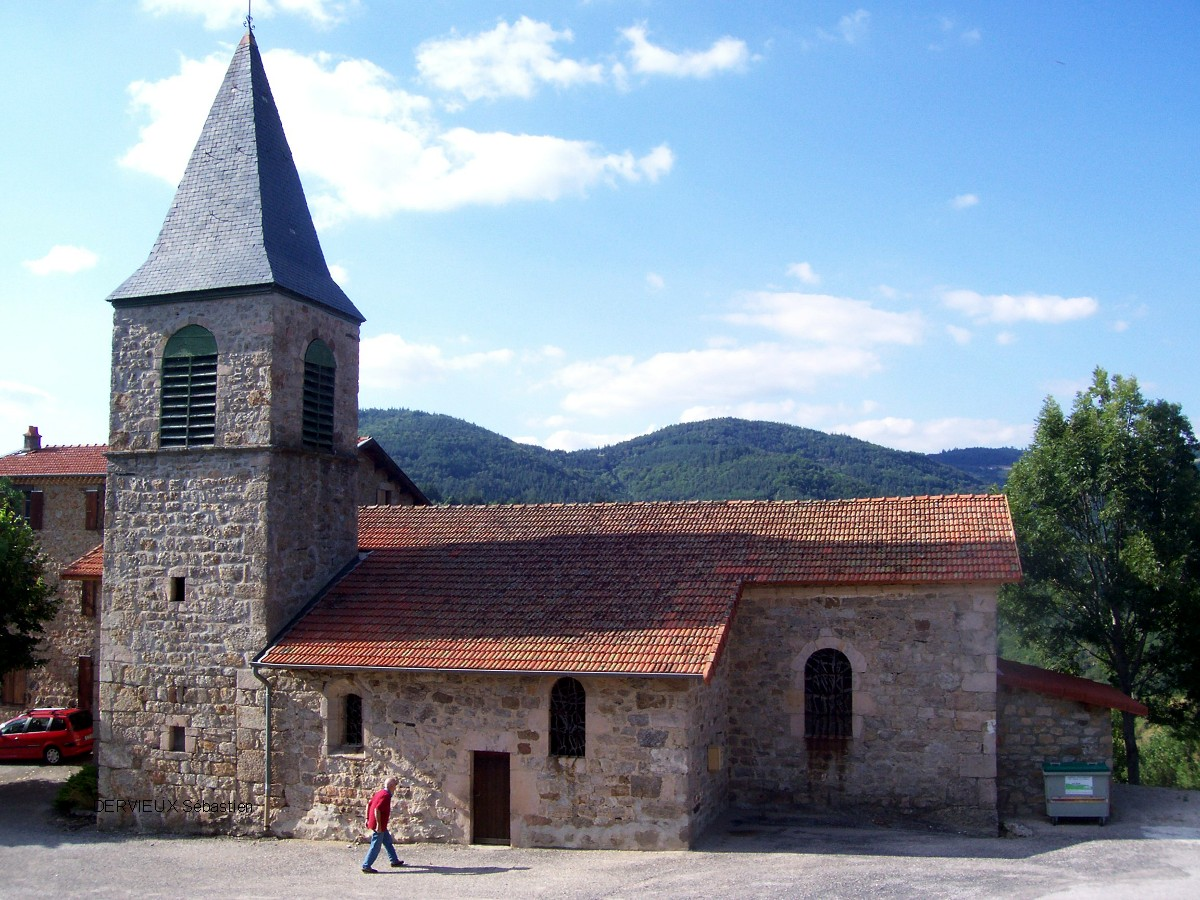
- The church in Lafarre
- Location of Lafarre
- Location within France Location within Auvergne-Rhône-Alpes
- Coordinates: 45°04′49″N 4°30′37″E
- Country: France
- Region: Auvergne-Rhône-Alpes
- Department: Ardèche
- Arrondissement: Tournon-sur-Rhône
- Canton: Haut-Vivarais

Government
  - Mayor (2020–2026): Stéphane Roche
- Area^{1}: 11.33 km^{2} (4.37 sq mi)
- Elevation: 720 m (2,360 ft)
- Highest elevation: 1,183 m (3,881 ft)
- Lowest elevation: 540 m (1,770 ft)
- Population (2023): 45
  - Density: 4.0/km^{2} (10/sq mi)
- Time zone: UTC+01:00 (CET)
  - Summer (DST): UTC+02:00 (CEST)
- INSEE/Postal code: 07124 /07520
- ^{1} French Land Register data, which excludes lakes, ponds, glaciers > 1 km^{2} (0.386 sq mi or 247 acres) and river estuaries.

Lafarre (French pronunciation: [lafaʁ]; Occitan: La Fara) is a commune in the Ardèche department in southern France.

== Population ==
Historical population
Year	Pop.	±% p.a.
1968	111	—
1975	74	−5.63%
1982	70	−0.79%
1990	60	−1.91%
1999	57	−0.57%
2007	43	−3.46%
2012	35	−4.03%
2017	39	+2.19%
2023	45	+2.41%
Source: INSEE

== See also ==
- Communes of the Ardèche department
