= Pailharès =

- Commune
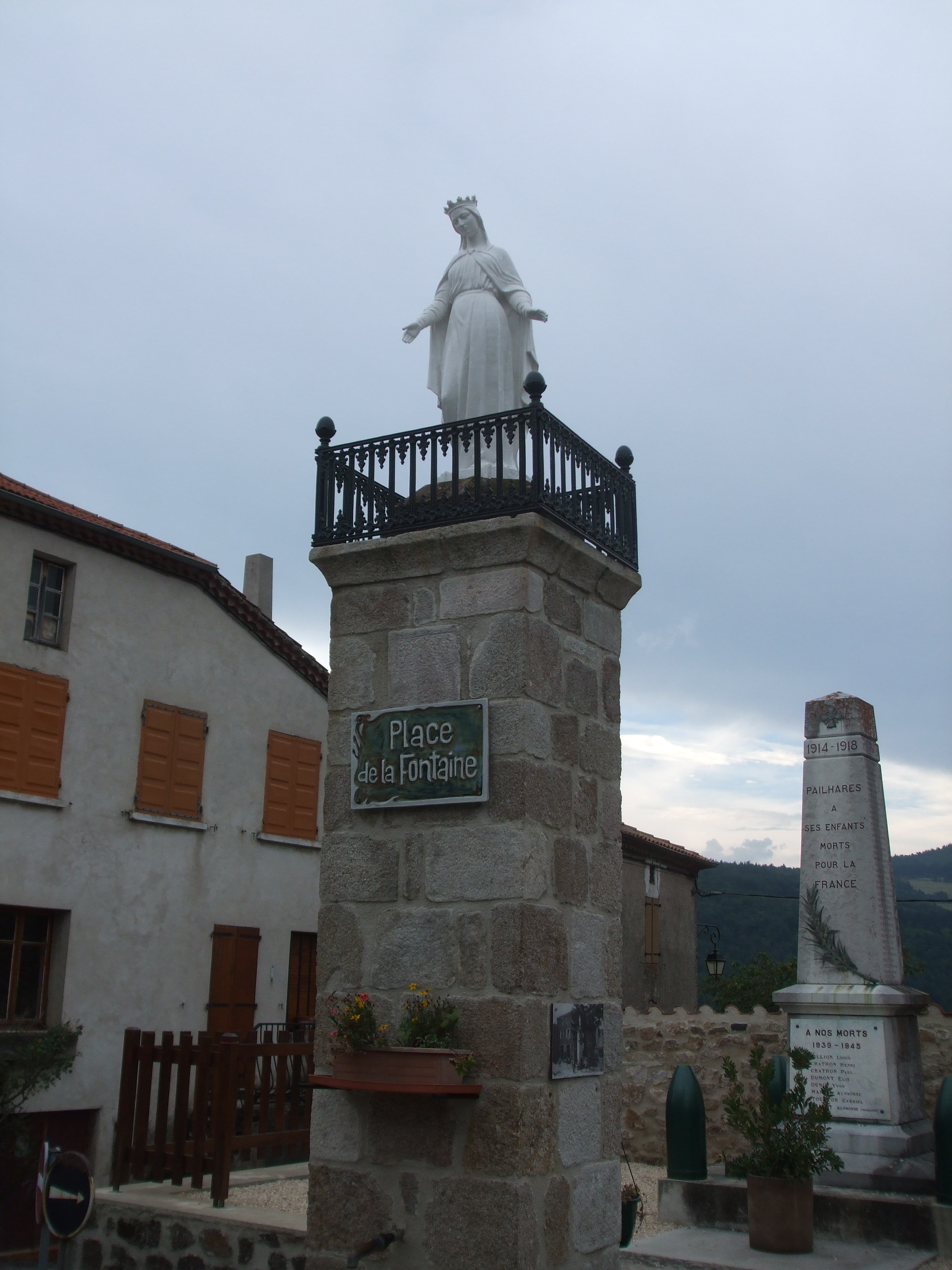
- The fountain square and statue of the Virgin in Pailharès
- Location of Pailharès
- Location within France Location within Auvergne-Rhône-Alpes
- Coordinates: 45°04′45″N 4°33′59″E
- Country: France
- Region: Auvergne-Rhône-Alpes
- Department: Ardèche
- Arrondissement: Tournon-sur-Rhône
- Canton: Haut-Vivarais
- Intercommunality: CA Arche Agglo

Government
  - Mayor (2020–2026): Anne Schmitt
- Area^{1}: 19.69 km^{2} (7.60 sq mi)
- Elevation: 700 m (2,300 ft)
- Highest elevation: 1,184 m (3,885 ft)
- Lowest elevation: 496 m (1,627 ft)
- Population (2023): 310
  - Density: 16/km^{2} (41/sq mi)
- Time zone: UTC+01:00 (CET)
  - Summer (DST): UTC+02:00 (CEST)
- INSEE/Postal code: 07170 /07410
- ^{1} French Land Register data, which excludes lakes, ponds, glaciers > 1 km^{2} (0.386 sq mi or 247 acres) and river estuaries.

Pailharès (French pronunciation: [pajaʁɛ(s)]) is a commune in the Ardèche department in southern France.

== Population ==
Historical population
Year	Pop.	±% p.a.
1968	511	—
1975	402	−3.37%
1982	328	−2.86%
1990	285	−1.74%
1999	288	+0.12%
2007	289	+0.04%
2012	273	−1.13%
2017	244	−2.22%
2023	310	+4.07%
Source: INSEE

== See also ==
- Communes of the Ardèche department
