= Doux (river) =

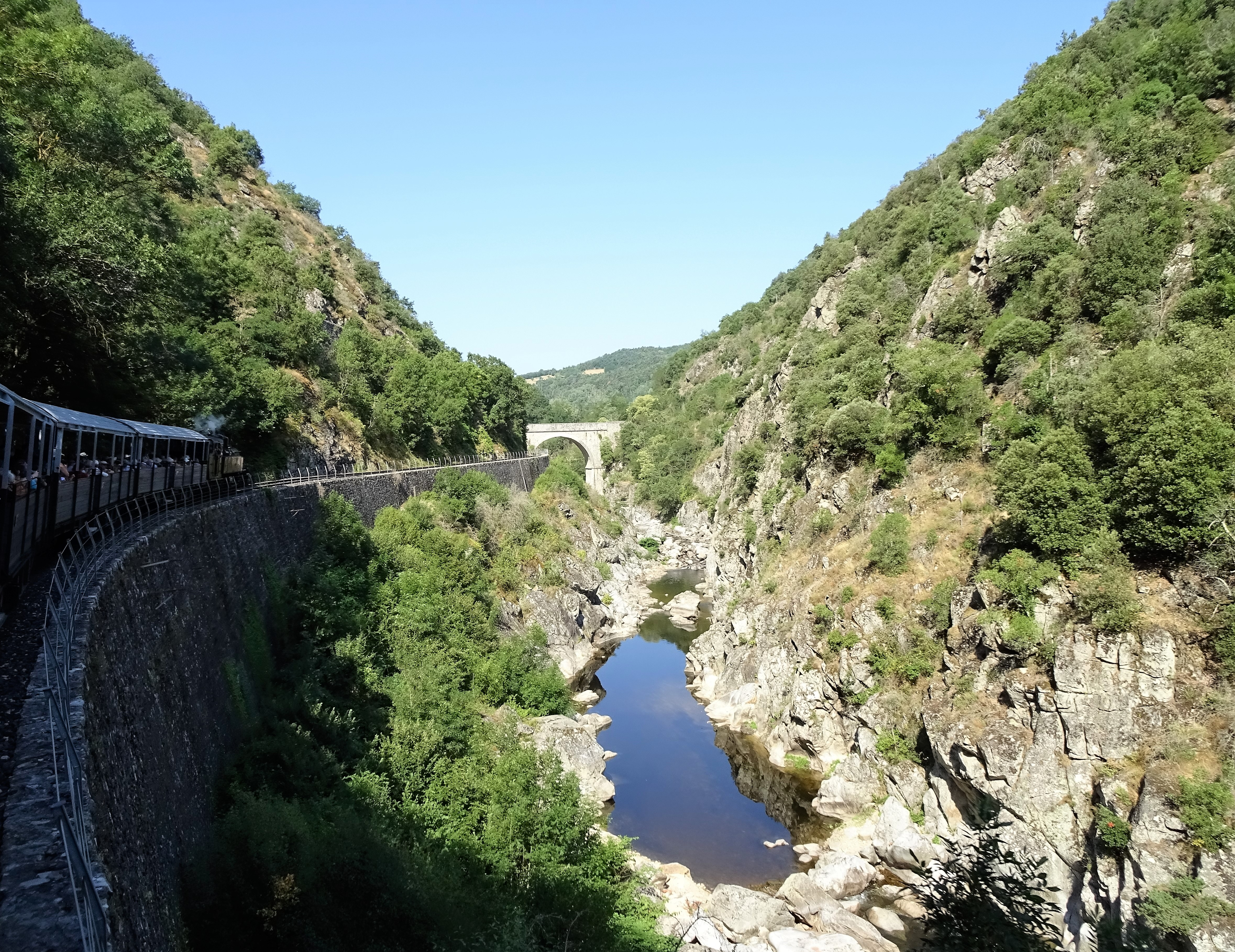
- Gorges du Doux

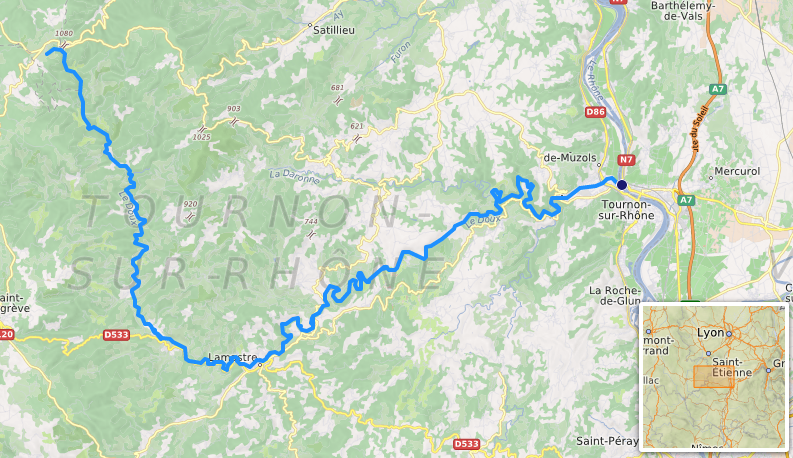

Location
- Country: France

Physical characteristics
- Source
  - location: Massif Central
- Mouth: Rhône
  - location: Tournon-sur-Rhône
  - coordinates: 45°04′22″N 4°49′45″E
- Length: 70 km (43 mi)

Basin features
- Progression: Rhône→ Mediterranean Sea

The Doux (French pronunciation: [du]; Occitan: Dòç) is a tributary of the Rhône in the Haute-Loire and Ardèche departments, France. It is 70 km (43 mi) long. It begins in the Massif Central and joins the Rhône in Tournon-sur-Rhône. It passes through the town Lamastre. The Chemin de fer du Vivarais heritage railway from Tournon-sur-Rhône to Lamastre runs through the Doux valley.
