= Préaux, Ardèche =

Préaux
- Commune
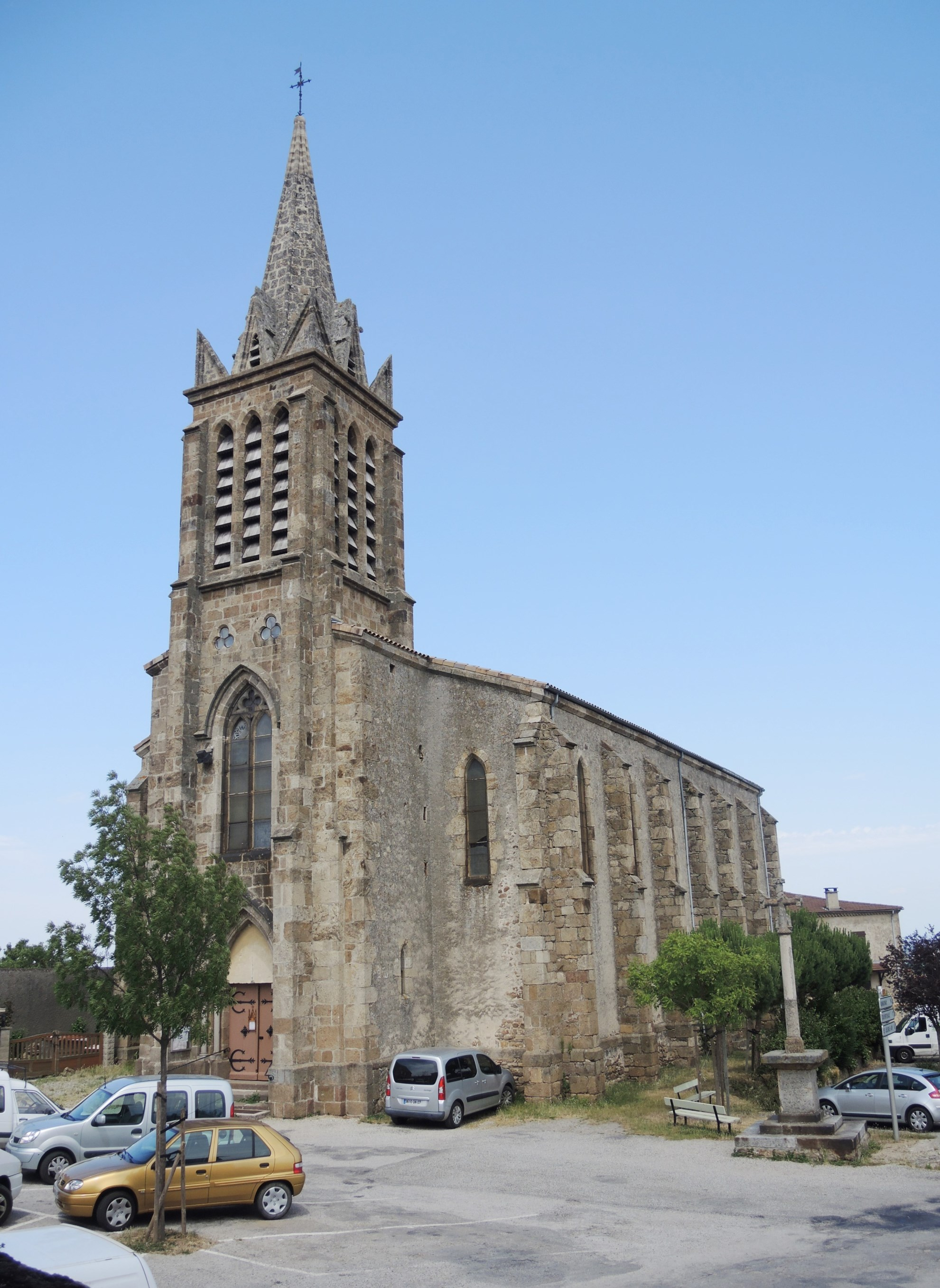
- The church in Préaux
- Location of Préaux
- Location within France Location within Auvergne-Rhône-Alpes
- Coordinates: 45°08′37″N 4°39′51″E
- Country: France
- Region: Auvergne-Rhône-Alpes
- Department: Ardèche
- Arrondissement: Tournon-sur-Rhône
- Canton: Haut-Vivarais
- Intercommunality: Val d'Ay

Government
  - Mayor (2020–2026): Christian Roche
- Area^{1}: 22.33 km^{2} (8.62 sq mi)
- Elevation: 530 m (1,740 ft)
- Highest elevation: 980 m (3,220 ft)
- Lowest elevation: 353 m (1,158 ft)
- Population (2023): 708
  - Density: 31.7/km^{2} (82.1/sq mi)
- Time zone: UTC+01:00 (CET)
  - Summer (DST): UTC+02:00 (CEST)
- INSEE/Postal code: 07185 /07290
- ^{1} French Land Register data, which excludes lakes, ponds, glaciers > 1 km^{2} (0.386 sq mi or 247 acres) and river estuaries.

Préaux (French pronunciation: [pʁeo]; Occitan: Preaus) is a commune in the Ardèche department in southern France.

== Population ==
Historical population
Year	Pop.	±% p.a.
1968	554	—
1975	505	−1.31%
1982	505	+0.00%
1990	511	+0.15%
1999	514	+0.07%
2007	555	+0.96%
2012	668	+3.78%
2017	690	+0.65%
2023	708	+0.43%
Source: INSEE

== See also ==
- Communes of the Ardèche department
