= Lamastre =

- Commune
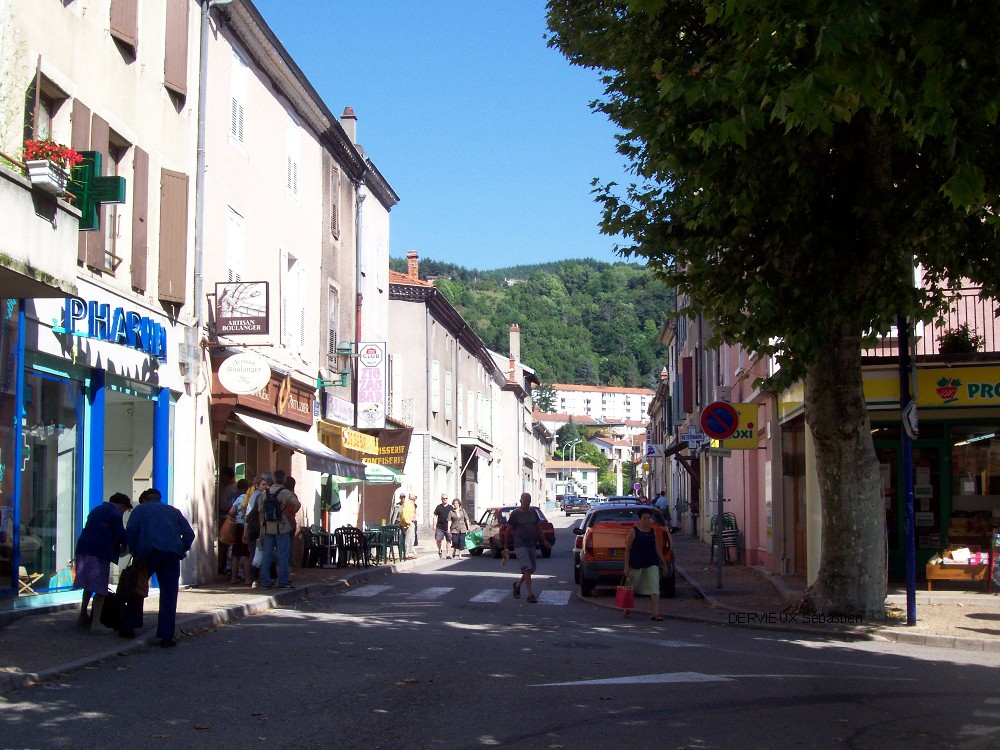
- The shopping area in Lamastre

- Coat of arms
- Location of Lamastre
- Location within France Location within Auvergne-Rhône-Alpes
- Coordinates: 44°59′11″N 4°34′54″E
- Country: France
- Region: Auvergne-Rhône-Alpes
- Department: Ardèche
- Arrondissement: Tournon-sur-Rhône
- Canton: Haut-Vivarais

Government
  - Mayor (2020–2026): Jean-Paul Vallon
- Area^{1}: 25.45 km^{2} (9.83 sq mi)
- Highest elevation: 860 m (2,820 ft)
- Lowest elevation: 342 m (1,122 ft)
- Population (2023): 2,327
  - Density: 91.43/km^{2} (236.8/sq mi)
- Time zone: UTC+01:00 (CET)
  - Summer (DST): UTC+02:00 (CEST)
- INSEE/Postal code: 07129 /07270
- ^{1} French Land Register data, which excludes lakes, ponds, glaciers > 1 km^{2} (0.386 sq mi or 247 acres) and river estuaries.

Lamastre (French pronunciation: [lamastʁ]; Occitan: La Mastra) is a commune in the Ardèche department in southern France. It lies on the river Doux. The Chemin de fer du Vivarais, a metre-gauge tourist railway, connects Lamastre with Tournon-sur-Rhône.

== Population ==
Historical population

Year	Pop.	±% p.a.
1793	1,800	—
1800	2,090	+2.16%
1806	1,798	−2.48%
1821	2,029	+0.81%
1831	2,218	+0.89%
1836	2,260	+0.38%
1841	2,423	+1.40%
1846	2,561	+1.11%
1851	2,501	−0.47%
1856	2,502	+0.01%
1861	2,925	+3.17%
1866	3,000	+0.51%
1872	3,180	+0.98%
1876	3,313	+1.03%
1881	3,209	−0.64%
1886	3,260	+0.32%
1891	3,693	+2.53%
1896	3,763	+0.38%
1901	3,759	−0.02%

Year	Pop.	±% p.a.
1906	3,735	−0.13%
1911	3,663	−0.39%
1921	3,514	−0.41%
1926	3,712	+1.10%
1931	3,727	+0.08%
1936	3,674	−0.29%
1946	3,241	−1.25%
1954	3,361	+0.46%
1962	3,228	−0.50%
1968	3,247	+0.10%
1975	3,058	−0.85%
1982	3,007	−0.24%
1990	2,717	−1.26%
1999	2,467	−1.07%
2007	2,541	+0.37%
2012	2,426	−0.92%
2017	2,318	−0.91%
2023	2,327	+0.06%

Source: EHESS and INSEE (1968-2023)

== See also ==
- Communes of the Ardèche department
