= Saint-Jeure-d'Ay =

- Commune
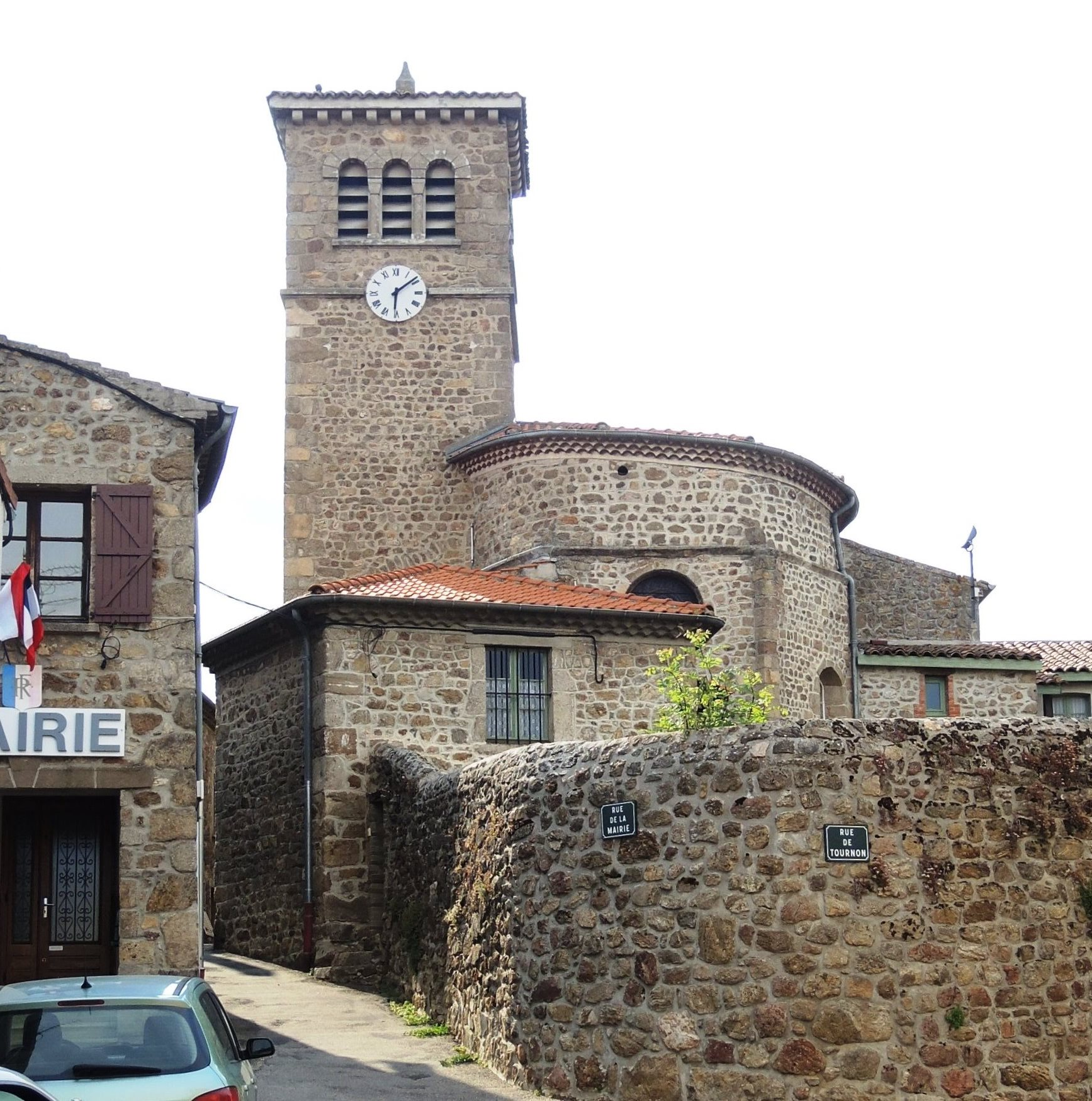
- The church in Saint-Jeure-d'Ay
- Location of Saint-Jeure-d'Ay
- Location within France Location within Auvergne-Rhône-Alpes
- Coordinates: 45°08′50″N 4°42′25″E
- Country: France
- Region: Auvergne-Rhône-Alpes
- Department: Ardèche
- Arrondissement: Tournon-sur-Rhône
- Canton: Haut-Vivarais
- Intercommunality: Val d'Ay

Government
  - Mayor (2020–2026): Brigitte Martin
- Area^{1}: 6.9 km^{2} (2.7 sq mi)
- Elevation: 480 m (1,570 ft)
- Highest elevation: 552 m (1,811 ft)
- Lowest elevation: 353 m (1,158 ft)
- Population (2023): 495
  - Density: 72/km^{2} (190/sq mi)
- Time zone: UTC+01:00 (CET)
  - Summer (DST): UTC+02:00 (CEST)
- INSEE/Postal code: 07250 /07290
- ^{1} French Land Register data, which excludes lakes, ponds, glaciers > 1 km^{2} (0.386 sq mi or 247 acres) and river estuaries.

Saint-Jeure-d'Ay (French pronunciation: [sɛ̃ ʒœʁ dɛ]; Occitan: Sant Jeure d'Ai) is a commune in the Ardèche department in southern France.

== Population ==
Historical population
Year	Pop.	±% p.a.
1968	299	—
1975	304	+0.24%
1982	349	+1.99%
1990	370	+0.73%
1999	380	+0.30%
2007	437	+1.76%
2012	480	+1.89%
2017	479	−0.04%
2023	495	+0.55%
Source: INSEE

== See also ==
- Communes of the Ardèche department
