= Saint-Romain-d'Ay =

- Commune
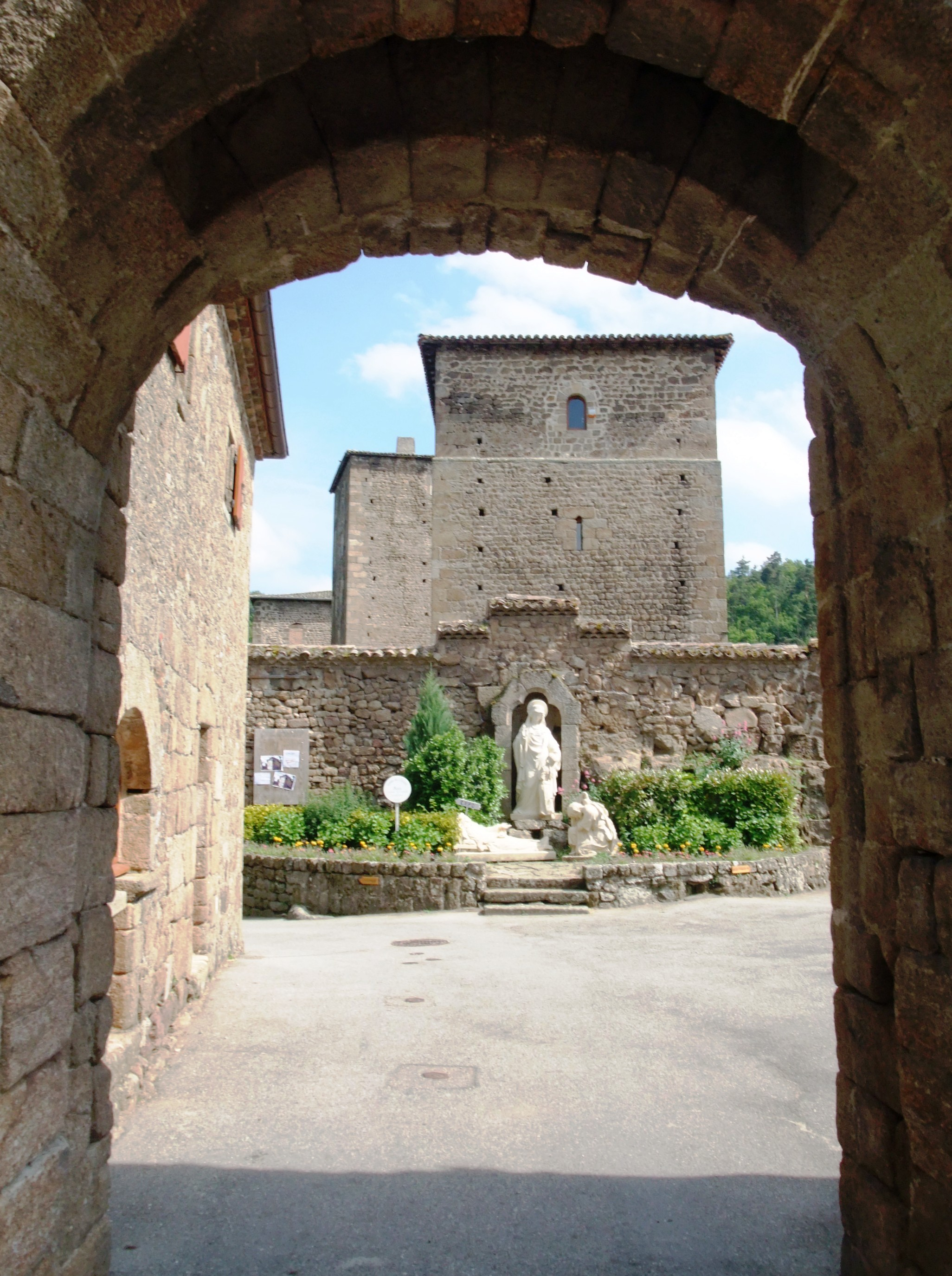
- The entrance to Saint-Romain d'Ay
- Location of Saint-Romain-d'Ay
- Location within France Location within Auvergne-Rhône-Alpes
- Coordinates: 45°10′03″N 4°39′58″E
- Country: France
- Region: Auvergne-Rhône-Alpes
- Department: Ardèche
- Arrondissement: Tournon-sur-Rhône
- Canton: Haut-Vivarais
- Intercommunality: Val d'Ay

Government
  - Mayor (2020–2026): Norbert Coll
- Area^{1}: 9.36 km^{2} (3.61 sq mi)
- Highest elevation: 586 m (1,923 ft)
- Lowest elevation: 315 m (1,033 ft)
- Population (2023): 1,164
  - Density: 124/km^{2} (322/sq mi)
- Time zone: UTC+01:00 (CET)
  - Summer (DST): UTC+02:00 (CEST)
- INSEE/Postal code: 07292 /07290
- ^{1} French Land Register data, which excludes lakes, ponds, glaciers > 1 km^{2} (0.386 sq mi or 247 acres) and river estuaries.

Saint-Romain-d'Ay (French pronunciation: [sɛ̃ ʁɔmɛ̃ dɛ]; Vivaro-Alpine: Sant Roman d'Ai) is a commune in the Ardèche department in southern France.

== Population ==
Historical population
Year	Pop.	±% p.a.
1968	483	—
1975	520	+1.06%
1982	574	+1.42%
1990	660	+1.76%
1999	775	+1.80%
2007	959	+2.70%
2012	1,075	+2.31%
2017	1,214	+2.46%
2023	1,164	−0.70%
Source: INSEE

== See also ==
- Communes of the Ardèche department
