= Andance =

- Commune
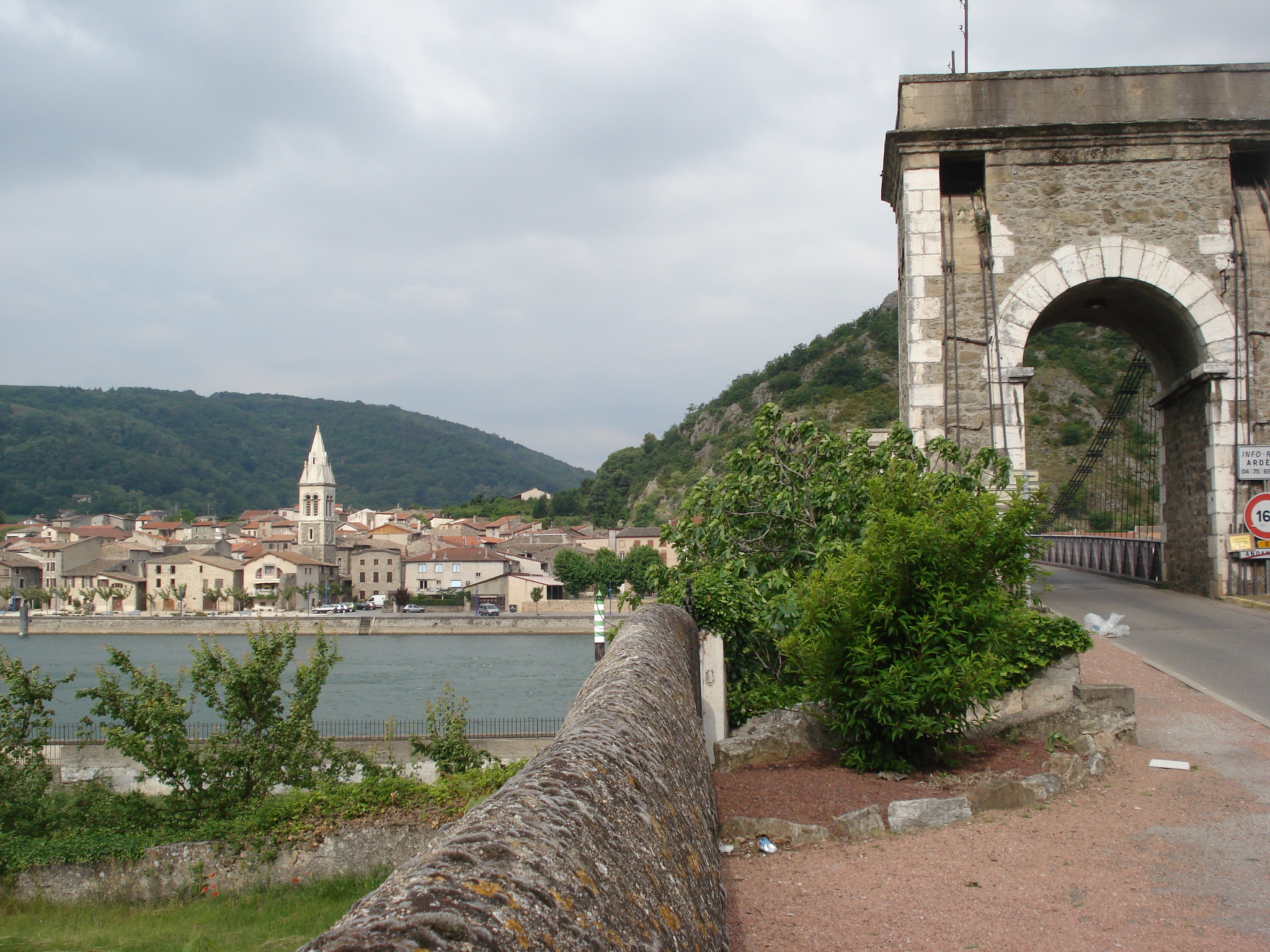
- View of Andance from Andancette, across the Rhone River and the Marc Seguin Bridge
- Location of Andance
- Location within France Location within Auvergne-Rhône-Alpes
- Coordinates: 45°14′29″N 4°48′00″E
- Country: France
- Region: Auvergne-Rhône-Alpes
- Department: Ardèche
- Arrondissement: Tournon-sur-Rhône
- Canton: Sarras
- Intercommunality: Porte de DrômArdèche

Government
  - Mayor (2020–2026): Christelle Reynaud
- Area^{1}: 6.52 km^{2} (2.52 sq mi)
- Elevation: 128 m (420 ft)
- Highest elevation: 363 m (1,191 ft)
- Lowest elevation: 121 m (397 ft)
- Population (2023): 1,192
  - Density: 183/km^{2} (474/sq mi)
- Time zone: UTC+01:00 (CET)
  - Summer (DST): UTC+02:00 (CEST)
- INSEE/Postal code: 07009 /07340
- ^{1} French Land Register data, which excludes lakes, ponds, glaciers > 1 km^{2} (0.386 sq mi or 247 acres) and river estuaries.

Andance (French pronunciation: [ɑ̃dɑ̃s]; Occitan: Andança) is a commune in the Ardèche department in the Auvergne-Rhône-Alpes region of southern France.

== Geography ==
Andance is located 5 km south of Saint-Rambert-d'Albon, 15 km east of Annonay, and 20 km north of Tournon-sur-Rhone. It can be accessed by the D86 road from Champagne in the north passing through the village then continuing south through the commune to Sarras. The D86B passes from the village over the Rhone to Andancette on the east bank. The D82 road also comes from Saint-Etienne-de-Valoux in the north-east to the village. There are also the small D370 road from Talencieux in the west to the village via a tortuous route and the D370B also from Talencieux to the south of the commune.

The commune has the Rhône as its entire eastern border with the Ruisseau de L'Ecoutay, the Ruisseau du Creux, the Ruisseau de Cueil, and numerous other streams flowing through the commune to the Rhone. The Conce river forms the southern border of the commune and also flows into the Rhone.

== Administration ==
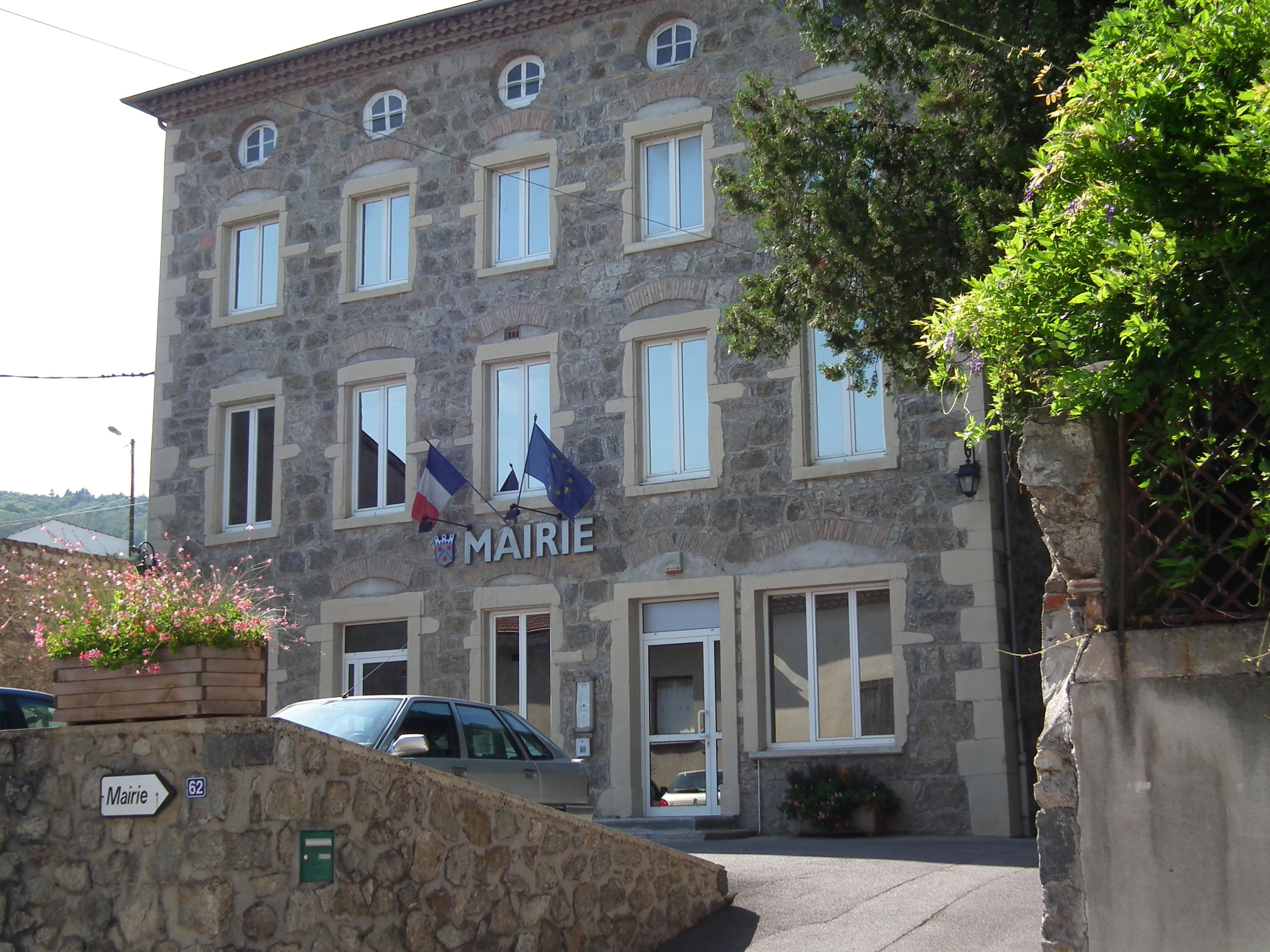
The Town Hall

List of Successive Mayors

From	To	Name	Party
2001	2008	Pierre Biennier	
2008	2014	Irène Fourel	
2014	2020	Alain Delaleuf	DVG
2020	Current	Christelle Reynaud	

== Population ==
The inhabitants of the commune are known as Andançois or Andançoises in French.

Historical population
Year	Pop.	±% p.a.
1968	926	—
1975	1,030	+1.53%
1982	920	−1.60%
1990	1,009	+1.16%
1999	984	−0.28%
2007	1,119	+1.62%
2012	1,150	+0.55%
2017	1,185	+0.60%
2023	1,192	+0.10%
Source: INSEE

== Culture and heritage ==
=== Civil heritage ===
- The Sarrazinière Roman Ruins (Antiquity) at Châtelet are registered as an historical monument
- Andance bridge was built in 1827 with iron wires and a central pier. The Andance bridge is the oldest suspension bridge still used today in France. It was built by Marc Seguin the brilliant inventor from Annonay. Largely destroyed during the Second World War on 30 August 1944, it was rebuilt and reopened in 1946 then underwent further changes

=== Religious heritage ===
- The Church of Our Lady of Andance (12th century) is registered as an historical monument
- A Calvary of Three Saints.

The Church contains many items that are registered as historical objects:

- A Painting: Saint Philomena Martyred (19th century)
- A Painting: Saint Romain (1835)
- A Painting: Pope Pius IX remitting indulgences to the Andance Priest for the Saint-Barrel Chapel (19th century)
- A Painting: Crusaders bringing relics to the chapel (19th century)
- An Altar Cross (19th century)
- A Processional Cross (19th century)
- 2 Prints with frames: Stations of the Cross (19th century)
- A Reliquary (19th century)
- A Statue: Saint Barulas (19th century)
- A Statue: Black Madonna (19th century)
- A Passion Cross: Cross of Bargemen

=== Andance in the arts ===
Andance is mentioned in the poem by Louis Aragon, The conscript of a hundred villages, written as an act of clandestine intellectual resistance in 1943 during the Second World War.

== See also ==
- Communes of the Ardèche department
