= Saint-Clair, Ardèche =

Saint-Clair
- Commune
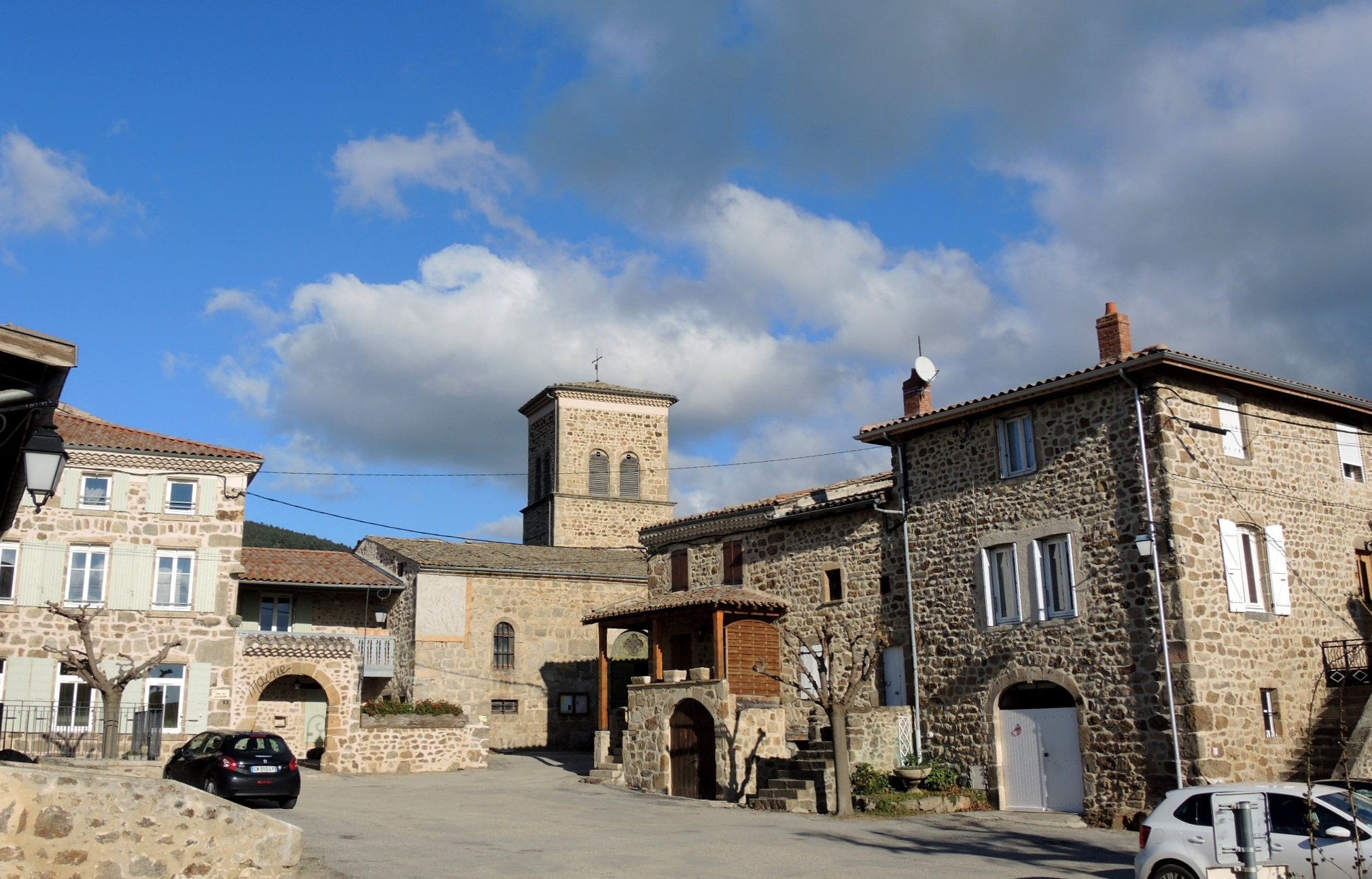
- The main square in the old village
- Location of Saint-Clair
- Location within France Location within Auvergne-Rhône-Alpes
- Coordinates: 45°16′44″N 4°40′53″E
- Country: France
- Region: Auvergne-Rhône-Alpes
- Department: Ardèche
- Arrondissement: Tournon-sur-Rhône
- Canton: Annonay-1
- Intercommunality: Annonay Rhône Agglo

Government
  - Mayor (2020–2026): René Sabatier
- Area^{1}: 5.81 km^{2} (2.24 sq mi)
- Elevation: 450 m (1,480 ft)
- Highest elevation: 715 m (2,346 ft)
- Lowest elevation: 397 m (1,302 ft)
- Population (2023): 1,348
  - Density: 232/km^{2} (601/sq mi)
- Time zone: UTC+01:00 (CET)
  - Summer (DST): UTC+02:00 (CEST)
- INSEE/Postal code: 07225 /07430
- ^{1} French Land Register data, which excludes lakes, ponds, glaciers > 1 km^{2} (0.386 sq mi or 247 acres) and river estuaries.

Saint-Clair (French pronunciation: [sɛ̃ klɛːʁ]; Occitan: Sant Clar) is a commune in the Ardèche department in southern France.

== Population ==
Historical population
Year	Pop.	±% p.a.
1968	281	—
1975	425	+6.09%
1982	641	+6.05%
1990	742	+1.85%
1999	918	+2.39%
2007	1,010	+1.20%
2012	1,069	+1.14%
2017	1,119	+0.92%
2023	1,348	+3.15%
Source: INSEE

== See also ==
- Communes of the Ardèche department
