= Vocance =

- Commune
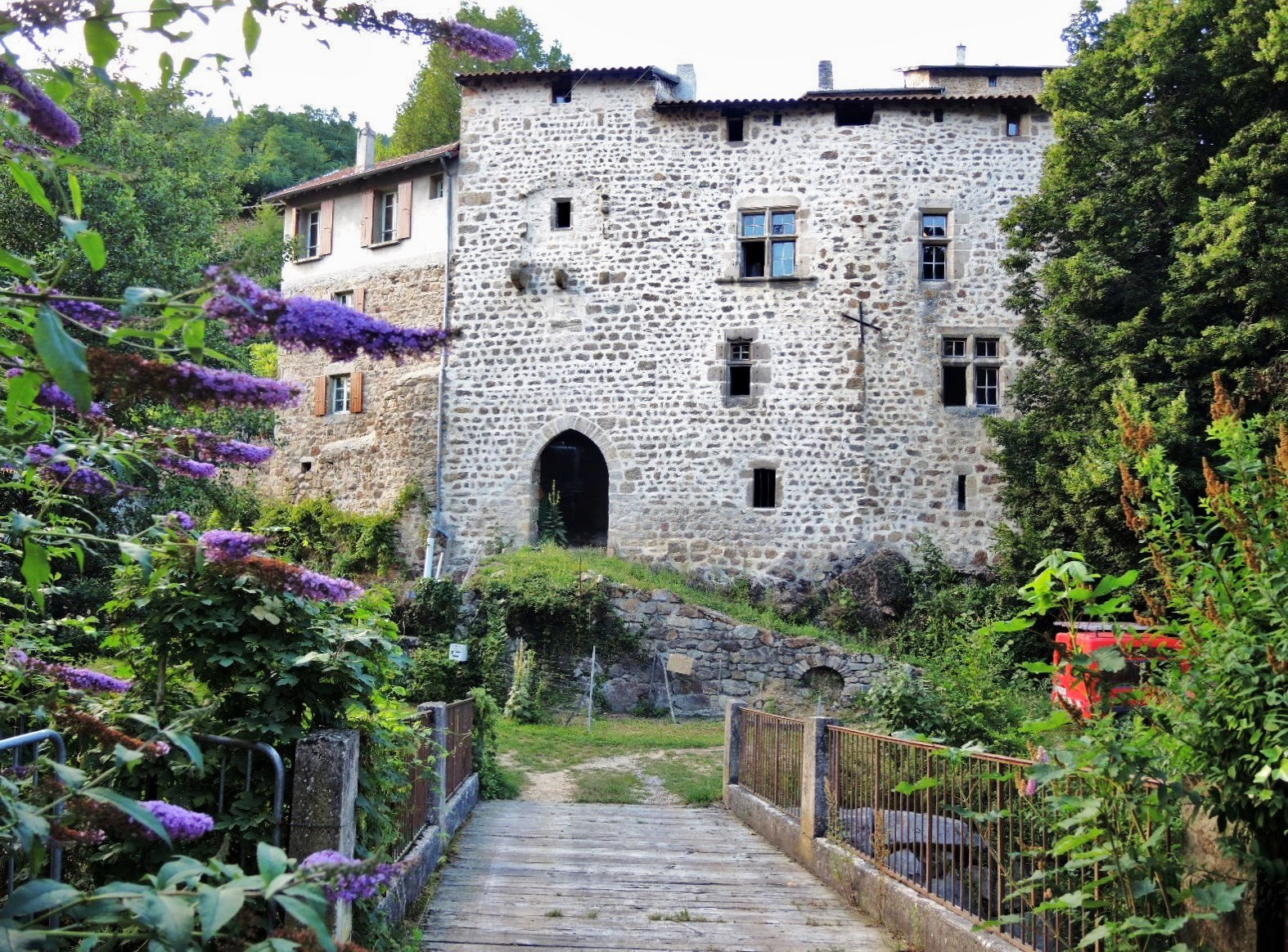
- The entrance to the chateau in Vocance

- Coat of arms
- Location of Vocance
- Location within France Location within Auvergne-Rhône-Alpes
- Coordinates: 45°12′07″N 4°33′12″E
- Country: France
- Region: Auvergne-Rhône-Alpes
- Department: Ardèche
- Arrondissement: Tournon-sur-Rhône
- Canton: Annonay-2
- Intercommunality: Annonay Rhône Agglo

Government
  - Mayor (2020–2026): Virginie Ferrand
- Area^{1}: 17.17 km^{2} (6.63 sq mi)
- Elevation: 510 m (1,670 ft)
- Highest elevation: 1,191 m (3,907 ft)
- Lowest elevation: 442 m (1,450 ft)
- Population (2023): 613
  - Density: 35.7/km^{2} (92.5/sq mi)
- Time zone: UTC+01:00 (CET)
  - Summer (DST): UTC+02:00 (CEST)
- INSEE/Postal code: 07347 /07690
- ^{1} French Land Register data, which excludes lakes, ponds, glaciers > 1 km^{2} (0.386 sq mi or 247 acres) and river estuaries.

Vocance (French pronunciation: [vɔkɑ̃s]; Occitan: Vaucança) is a commune in the Ardèche department in southern France.

== Population ==
Historical population
Year	Pop.	±% p.a.
1968	823	—
1975	814	−0.16%
1982	699	−2.15%
1990	661	−0.70%
1999	619	−0.73%
2007	617	−0.04%
2012	584	−1.09%
2017	610	+0.87%
2023	613	+0.08%
Source: INSEE

== See also ==
- Communes of the Ardèche department
