= Annonay Rhône Agglo =

- Communauté d'agglomération
- Interactive map of Annonay Rhône Agglo
- Coordinates: 45°15′N 04°41′E
- Country: France
- Region: Auvergne-Rhône-Alpes
- Department: Ardèche
- No. of communes: {{{nbcomm}}}
- Established: 2017
- Area: 316.3 km^{2} (122.1 sq mi)
- Population (2019): 48,798
  - Density: 154.3/km^{2} (399.6/sq mi)
- Website: annonayrhoneagglo.fr

Annonay Rhône Agglo is the communauté d'agglomération, an intercommunal structure, centred on the town of Annonay. It is located in the Ardèche department, in the Auvergne-Rhône-Alpes region, southern France. Created in 2017, its seat is in Davézieux. Its area is 316.3 km^{2}. Its population was 48,798 in 2019, of which 16,297 in Annonay proper.

== Composition ==
The communauté d'agglomération consists of the following 29 communes:

1. Annonay
2. Ardoix
3. Bogy
4. Boulieu-lès-Annonay
5. Brossainc
6. Charnas
7. Colombier-le-Cardinal
8. Davézieux
9. Félines
10. Limony
11. Monestier
12. Peaugres
13. Quintenas
14. Roiffieux
15. Saint-Clair
16. Saint-Cyr
17. Saint-Désirat
18. Saint-Jacques-d'Atticieux
19. Saint-Julien-Vocance
20. Saint-Marcel-lès-Annonay
21. Savas
22. Serrières
23. Talencieux
24. Thorrenc
25. Vanosc
26. Vernosc-lès-Annonay
27. Villevocance
28. Vinzieux
29. Vocance
