= Brossainc =

- Commune
- Location of Brossainc
- Location within France Location within Auvergne-Rhône-Alpes
- Coordinates: 45°19′52″N 4°40′47″E
- Country: France
- Region: Auvergne-Rhône-Alpes
- Department: Ardèche
- Arrondissement: Tournon-sur-Rhône
- Canton: Sarras
- Intercommunality: Annonay Rhône Agglo

Government
  - Mayor (2020–2026): Christian Massola
- Area^{1}: 4.38 km^{2} (1.69 sq mi)
- Elevation: 420 m (1,380 ft)
- Highest elevation: 753 m (2,470 ft)
- Lowest elevation: 363 m (1,191 ft)
- Population (2023): 262
  - Density: 59.8/km^{2} (155/sq mi)
- Time zone: UTC+01:00 (CET)
  - Summer (DST): UTC+02:00 (CEST)
- INSEE/Postal code: 07044 /07340
- ^{1} French Land Register data, which excludes lakes, ponds, glaciers > 1 km^{2} (0.386 sq mi or 247 acres) and river estuaries.

Brossainc (Arpitan: Brossenc) is a commune in the Ardèche department in southern France.

== Population ==
Historical population
Year	Pop.	±% p.a.
1968	166	—
1975	143	−2.11%
1982	135	−0.82%
1990	142	+0.63%
1999	165	+1.68%
2007	173	+0.59%
2012	228	+5.68%
2017	279	+4.12%
2023	262	−1.04%
Source: INSEE

== See also ==
- Communes of the Ardèche department
