= Colombier-le-Cardinal =

- Commune
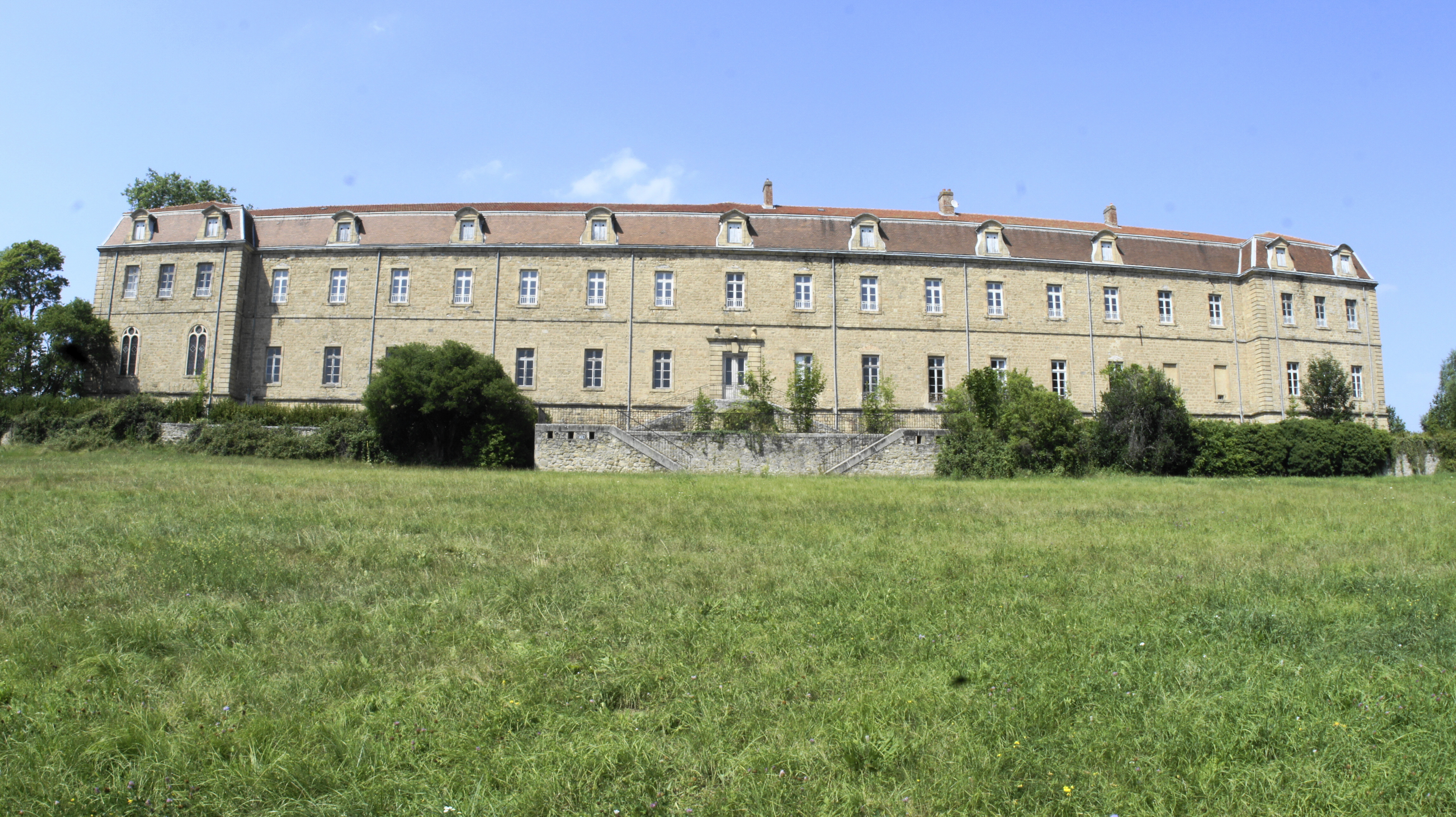
- Château des Célestins
- Location of Colombier-le-Cardinal
- Location within France Location within Auvergne-Rhône-Alpes
- Coordinates: 45°16′04″N 4°44′36″E
- Country: France
- Region: Auvergne-Rhône-Alpes
- Department: Ardèche
- Arrondissement: Tournon-sur-Rhône
- Canton: Sarras
- Intercommunality: Annonay Rhône Agglo

Government
  - Mayor (2020–2026): Olivier de Lagarde
- Area^{1}: 2.5 km^{2} (0.97 sq mi)
- Elevation: 350 m (1,150 ft)
- Highest elevation: 392 m (1,286 ft)
- Lowest elevation: 311 m (1,020 ft)
- Population (2023): 327
  - Density: 130/km^{2} (340/sq mi)
- Time zone: UTC+01:00 (CET)
  - Summer (DST): UTC+02:00 (CEST)
- INSEE/Postal code: 07067 /07430
- ^{1} French Land Register data, which excludes lakes, ponds, glaciers > 1 km^{2} (0.386 sq mi or 247 acres) and river estuaries.

Colombier-le-Cardinal (French pronunciation: [kɔlɔ̃bje lə kaʁdinal]；Occitan: Colombèir lo Cardinal) is a commune in the Ardèche department in southern France.

== Population ==
Historical population
Year	Pop.	±% p.a.
1968	150	—
1975	140	−0.98%
1982	146	+0.60%
1990	201	+4.08%
1999	229	+1.46%
2007	257	+1.45%
2012	279	+1.66%
2017	292	+0.92%
2023	327	+1.90%
Source: INSEE

== See also ==
- Communes of the Ardèche department
