= Bogy =

- Commune
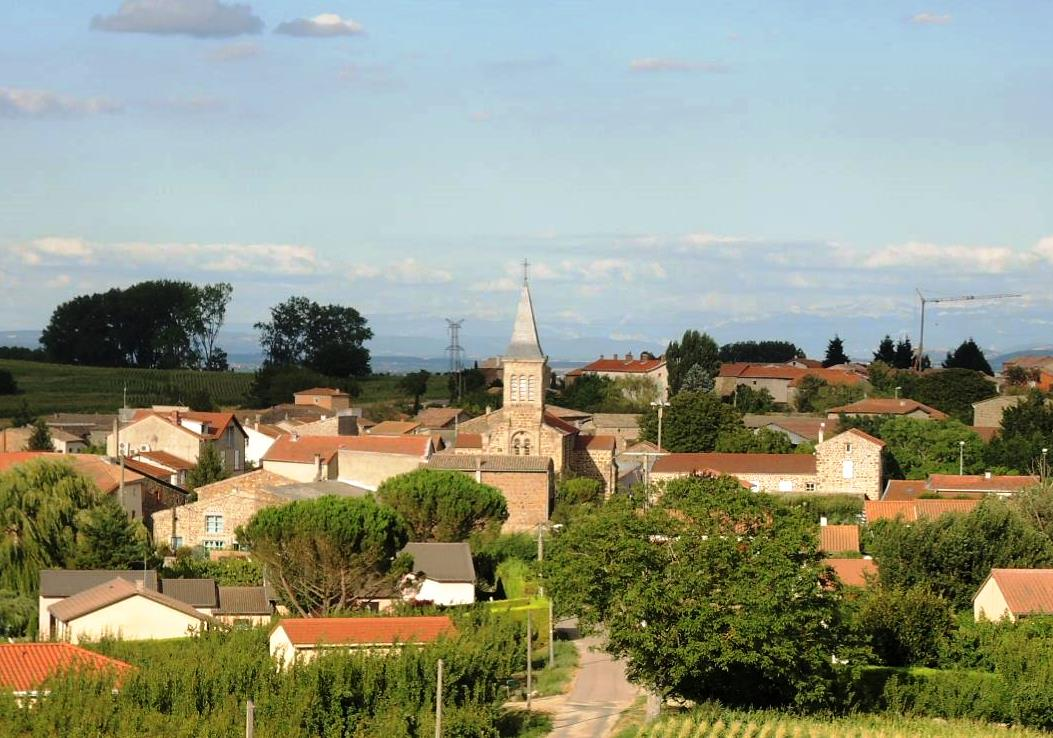
- Location of Bogy
- Location within France Location within Auvergne-Rhône-Alpes
- Coordinates: 45°17′02″N 4°45′42″E
- Country: France
- Region: Auvergne-Rhône-Alpes
- Department: Ardèche
- Arrondissement: Tournon-sur-Rhône
- Canton: Sarras
- Intercommunality: Annonay Rhône Agglo

Government
  - Mayor (2020–2026): Jean-Yves Bonnet
- Area^{1}: 7.02 km^{2} (2.71 sq mi)
- Elevation: 372 m (1,220 ft)
- Highest elevation: 403 m (1,322 ft)
- Lowest elevation: 239 m (784 ft)
- Population (2023): 488
  - Density: 69.5/km^{2} (180/sq mi)
- Time zone: UTC+01:00 (CET)
  - Summer (DST): UTC+02:00 (CEST)
- INSEE/Postal code: 07036 /07340
- ^{1} French Land Register data, which excludes lakes, ponds, glaciers > 1 km^{2} (0.386 sq mi or 247 acres) and river estuaries.

Bogy (French pronunciation: [bɔʒi]; Occitan: Bògi) is a commune of the Ardèche department in southern France.

== Geography ==
Bogy is located 10 km (6.2 mi) from Annonay, and 50 km (31 mi) from Valence.

== Population ==
Historical population
Year	Pop.	±% p.a.
1968	166	—
1975	179	+1.08%
1982	201	+1.67%
1990	245	+2.51%
1999	263	+0.79%
2007	328	+2.80%
2012	397	+3.89%
2017	434	+1.80%
2023	488	+1.97%
Source: INSEE

The inhabitants are called Boginois in French.

== See also ==
- Communes of the Ardèche department
