= Saint-Jacques-d'Atticieux =

- Commune
- Coat of arms
- Location of Saint-Jacques-d'Atticieux
- Location within France Location within Auvergne-Rhône-Alpes
- Coordinates: 45°20′08″N 4°40′06″E
- Country: France
- Region: Auvergne-Rhône-Alpes
- Department: Ardèche
- Arrondissement: Tournon-sur-Rhône
- Canton: Sarras
- Intercommunality: Annonay Rhône Agglo

Government
  - Mayor (2020–2026): Brigitte Bourret
- Area^{1}: 4.97 km^{2} (1.92 sq mi)
- Elevation: 470 m (1,540 ft)
- Highest elevation: 657 m (2,156 ft)
- Lowest elevation: 331 m (1,086 ft)
- Population (2023): 301
  - Density: 60.6/km^{2} (157/sq mi)
- Time zone: UTC+01:00 (CET)
  - Summer (DST): UTC+02:00 (CEST)
- INSEE/Postal code: 07243 /07340
- ^{1} French Land Register data, which excludes lakes, ponds, glaciers > 1 km^{2} (0.386 sq mi or 247 acres) and river estuaries.

Saint-Jacques-d'Atticieux (French pronunciation: [sɛ̃ ʒak datisjø]; Arpitan: Sant-Jâque-d’Aticiô) is a commune in the Ardèche department in southern France.

== Population ==
Historical population
| Year | Pop. | ±% p.a. |
|---|---|---|
| 1968 | 89 | — |
| 1975 | 76 | −2.23% |
| 1982 | 97 | +3.55% |
| 1990 | 170 | +7.27% |
| 1999 | 173 | +0.19% |
| 2007 | 237 | +4.01% |
| 2012 | 281 | +3.46% |
| 2017 | 309 | +1.92% |
| 2023 | 301 | −0.44% |
Source: INSEE

== See also ==
- Communes of the Ardèche department
