= Canton of Annonay-2 =

Coordinates: 45.23°N 4.68°E

- Canton
- Situation of the canton of Annonay-2 in the department of Ardèche
- Country: France
- Region: Auvergne-Rhône-Alpes
- Department: Ardèche
- No. of communes: {{{nbcomm}}}
- Population (2023): 16,958
- INSEE code: 0702

The canton of Annonay-2 is an administrative division of the Ardèche department, southern France. It was created at the French canton reorganisation which came into effect in March 2015. Its seat is in Annonay.

It consists of the following communes:

1. Annonay (partly)
2. Monestier
3. Roiffieux
4. Saint-Julien-Vocance
5. Talencieux
6. Thorrenc
7. Vanosc
8. Vernosc-lès-Annonay
9. Villevocance
10. Vocance
