= Peaugres =

- Commune
- Location of Peaugres
- Location within France Location within Auvergne-Rhône-Alpes
- Coordinates: 45°17′15″N 4°43′45″E
- Country: France
- Region: Auvergne-Rhône-Alpes
- Department: Ardèche
- Arrondissement: Tournon-sur-Rhône
- Canton: Sarras
- Intercommunality: Annonay Rhône Agglo

Government
  - Mayor (2020–2026): Ronan Philippe
- Area^{1}: 14.44 km^{2} (5.58 sq mi)
- Elevation: 380 m (1,250 ft)
- Highest elevation: 627 m (2,057 ft)
- Lowest elevation: 300 m (980 ft)
- Population (2023): 2,385
  - Density: 165.2/km^{2} (427.8/sq mi)
- Time zone: UTC+01:00 (CET)
  - Summer (DST): UTC+02:00 (CEST)
- INSEE/Postal code: 07172 /07340
- ^{1} French Land Register data, which excludes lakes, ponds, glaciers > 1 km^{2} (0.386 sq mi or 247 acres) and river estuaries.

Peaugres (French pronunciation: [poɡʁ]; Occitan: Peugre) is a commune in the Ardèche department in southern France.

== Population ==
Historical population
| Year | Pop. | ±% p.a. |
|---|---|---|
| 1968 | 578 | — |
| 1975 | 654 | +1.78% |
| 1982 | 1,028 | +6.67% |
| 1990 | 1,456 | +4.45% |
| 1999 | 1,681 | +1.61% |
| 2007 | 1,944 | +1.83% |
| 2012 | 1,962 | +0.18% |
| 2017 | 2,148 | +1.83% |
| 2023 | 2,385 | +1.76% |
Source: INSEE

== Points of Interest ==
- Safari de Peaugres - is a 80 ha zoo in the commune.

== See also ==
- Communes of the Ardèche department
