= Thorrenc =

- Commune
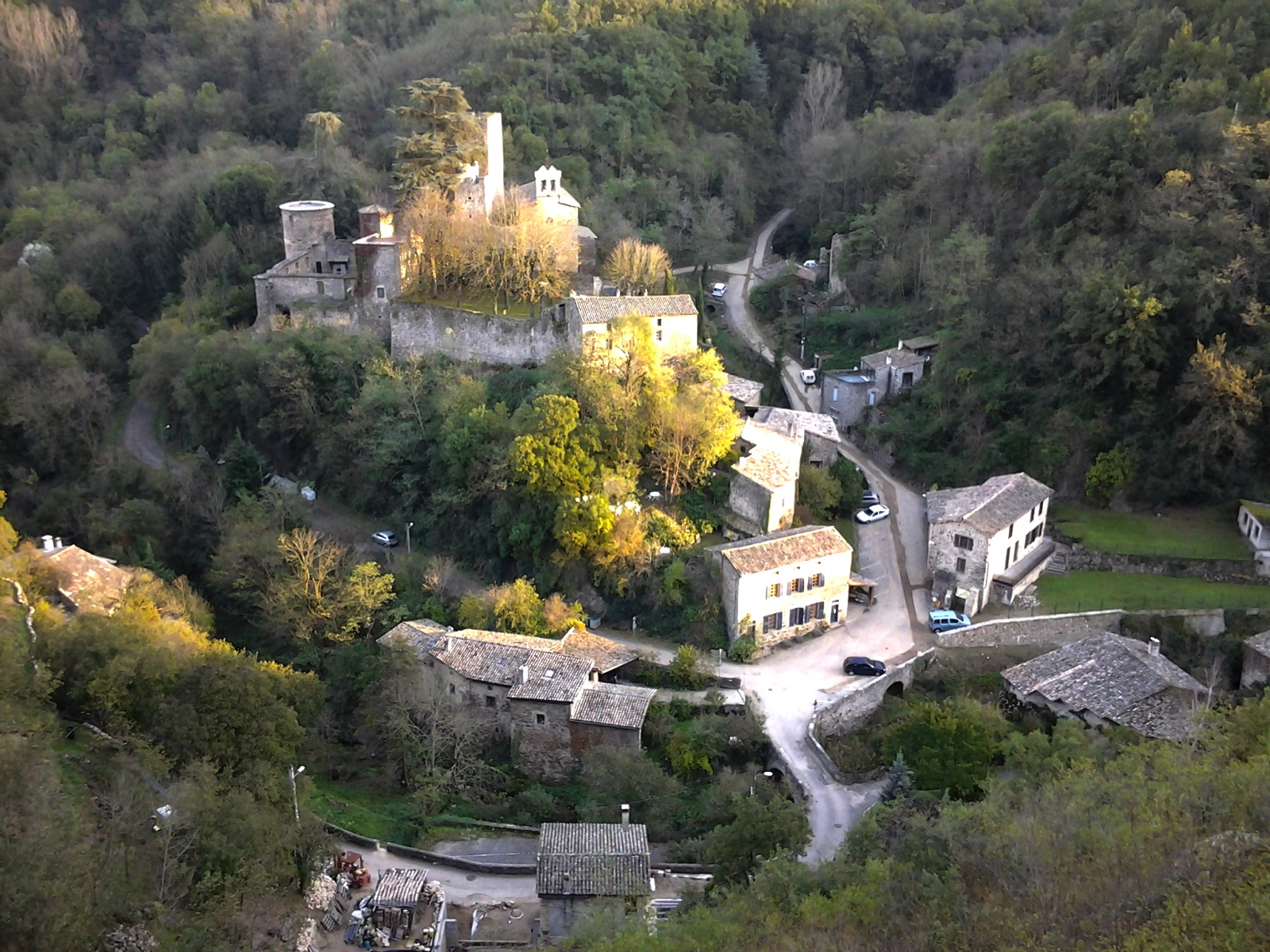
- Thorrenc seen from the old railway viaduct
- Location of Thorrenc
- Location within France Location within Auvergne-Rhône-Alpes
- Coordinates: 45°14′14″N 4°45′47″E
- Country: France
- Region: Auvergne-Rhône-Alpes
- Department: Ardèche
- Arrondissement: Tournon-sur-Rhône
- Canton: Annonay-2
- Intercommunality: Annonay Rhône Agglo

Government
  - Mayor (2020–2026): Christian Forel
- Area^{1}: 3.67 km^{2} (1.42 sq mi)
- Elevation: 240 m (790 ft)
- Highest elevation: 400 m (1,300 ft)
- Lowest elevation: 197 m (646 ft)
- Population (2023): 356
  - Density: 97.0/km^{2} (251/sq mi)
- Time zone: UTC+01:00 (CET)
  - Summer (DST): UTC+02:00 (CEST)
- INSEE/Postal code: 07321 /07340
- ^{1} French Land Register data, which excludes lakes, ponds, glaciers > 1 km^{2} (0.386 sq mi or 247 acres) and river estuaries.

Thorrenc (French pronunciation: [tɔʁɛ̃k]) is a commune in the Ardèche department in southern France.

== Population ==
Historical population
Year	Pop.	±% p.a.
1968	103	—
1975	84	−2.87%
1982	97	+2.08%
1990	152	+5.78%
1999	185	+2.21%
2007	236	+3.09%
2012	233	−0.26%
2017	233	+0.00%
2023	356	+7.32%
Source: INSEE

== See also ==
- Communes of the Ardèche department
