= Vinzieux =

- Commune
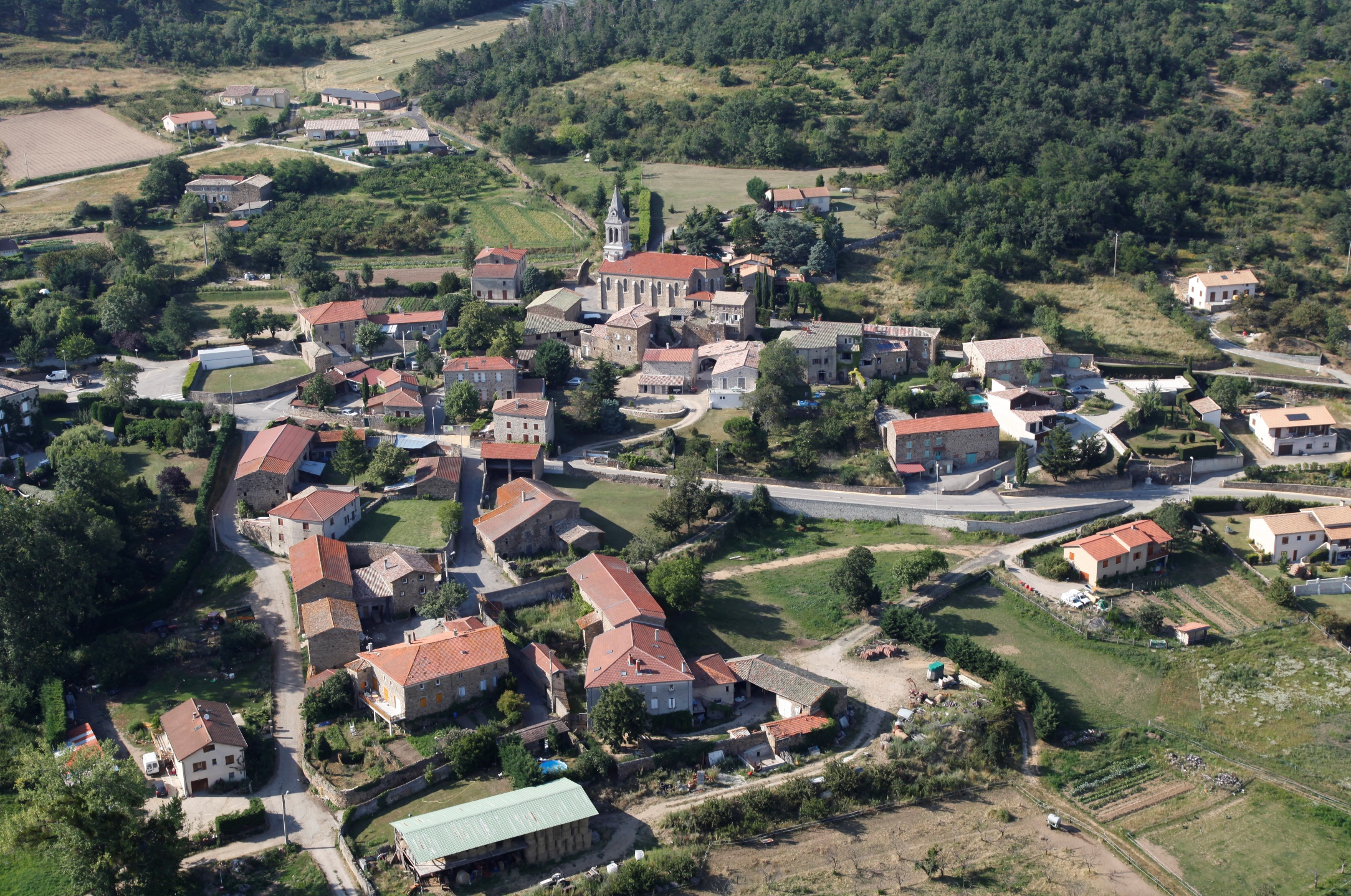
- Aerial view of Vinzieux

- Coat of arms
- Location of Vinzieux
- Location within France Location within Auvergne-Rhône-Alpes
- Coordinates: 45°19′41″N 4°42′06″E
- Country: France
- Region: Auvergne-Rhône-Alpes
- Department: Ardèche
- Arrondissement: Tournon-sur-Rhône
- Canton: Sarras
- Intercommunality: Annonay Rhône Agglo

Government
  - Mayor (2020–2026): Hugo Biolley
- Area^{1}: 6.87 km^{2} (2.65 sq mi)
- Elevation: 420 m (1,380 ft)
- Highest elevation: 753 m (2,470 ft)
- Lowest elevation: 317 m (1,040 ft)
- Population (2023): 538
  - Density: 78.3/km^{2} (203/sq mi)
- Time zone: UTC+01:00 (CET)
  - Summer (DST): UTC+02:00 (CEST)
- INSEE/Postal code: 07344 /07340
- ^{1} French Land Register data, which excludes lakes, ponds, glaciers > 1 km^{2} (0.386 sq mi or 247 acres) and river estuaries.

Vinzieux (French pronunciation: [vɛ̃zjø]; Arpitan: Vinziô) is a commune in the Ardèche department in southern France.

== Population ==
Historical population
Year	Pop.	±% p.a.
1968	163	—
1975	179	+1.35%
1982	181	+0.16%
1990	233	+3.21%
1999	262	+1.31%
2007	356	+3.91%
2012	421	+3.41%
2017	453	+1.48%
2023	538	+2.91%
Source: INSEE

== See also ==
- Communes of the Ardèche department
