= Vanosc =

- Commune
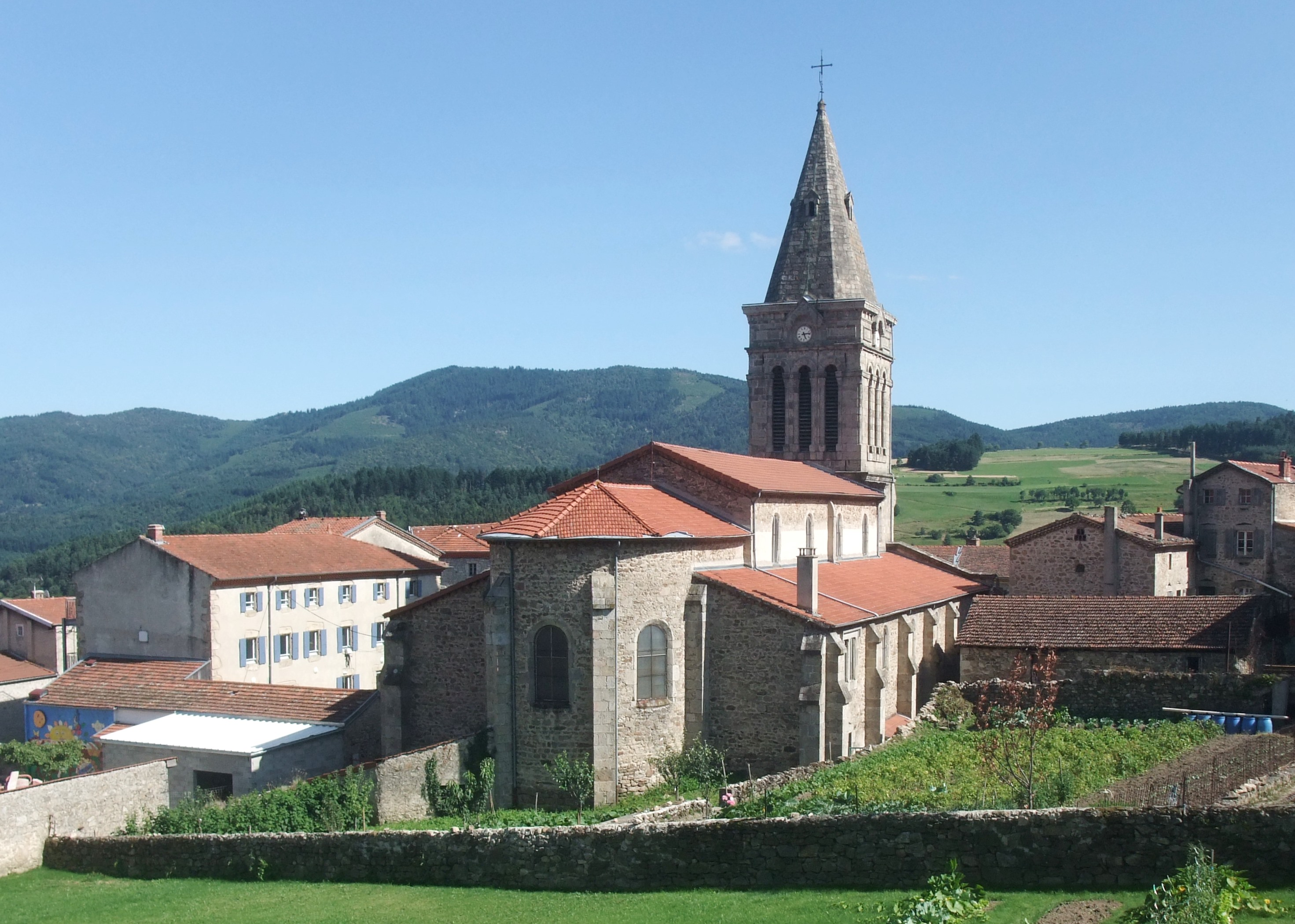
- The church in Vanosc
- Location of Vanosc
- Location within France Location within Auvergne-Rhône-Alpes
- Coordinates: 45°13′31″N 4°33′04″E
- Country: France
- Region: Auvergne-Rhône-Alpes
- Department: Ardèche
- Arrondissement: Tournon-sur-Rhône
- Canton: Annonay-2
- Intercommunality: Annonay Rhône Agglo

Government
  - Mayor (2020–2026): Dominique Mazingarbe
- Area^{1}: 26.1 km^{2} (10.1 sq mi)
- Elevation: 634 m (2,080 ft)
- Highest elevation: 1,371 m (4,498 ft)
- Lowest elevation: 460 m (1,510 ft)
- Population (2023): 907
  - Density: 34.8/km^{2} (90.0/sq mi)
- Time zone: UTC+01:00 (CET)
  - Summer (DST): UTC+02:00 (CEST)
- INSEE/Postal code: 07333 /07690
- ^{1} French Land Register data, which excludes lakes, ponds, glaciers > 1 km^{2} (0.386 sq mi or 247 acres) and river estuaries.

Vanosc (French pronunciation: [vanɔsk]; Occitan: Vanòsc) is a commune in the Ardèche department in southern France.

== Population ==
Historical population
Year	Pop.	±% p.a.
1968	883	—
1975	785	−1.67%
1982	805	+0.36%
1990	750	−0.88%
1999	767	+0.25%
2007	861	+1.46%
2012	916	+1.25%
2017	936	+0.43%
2023	907	−0.52%
Source: INSEE

== See also ==
- Communes of the Ardèche department
