= Saint-Cyr, Ardèche =

Saint-Cyr
- Commune
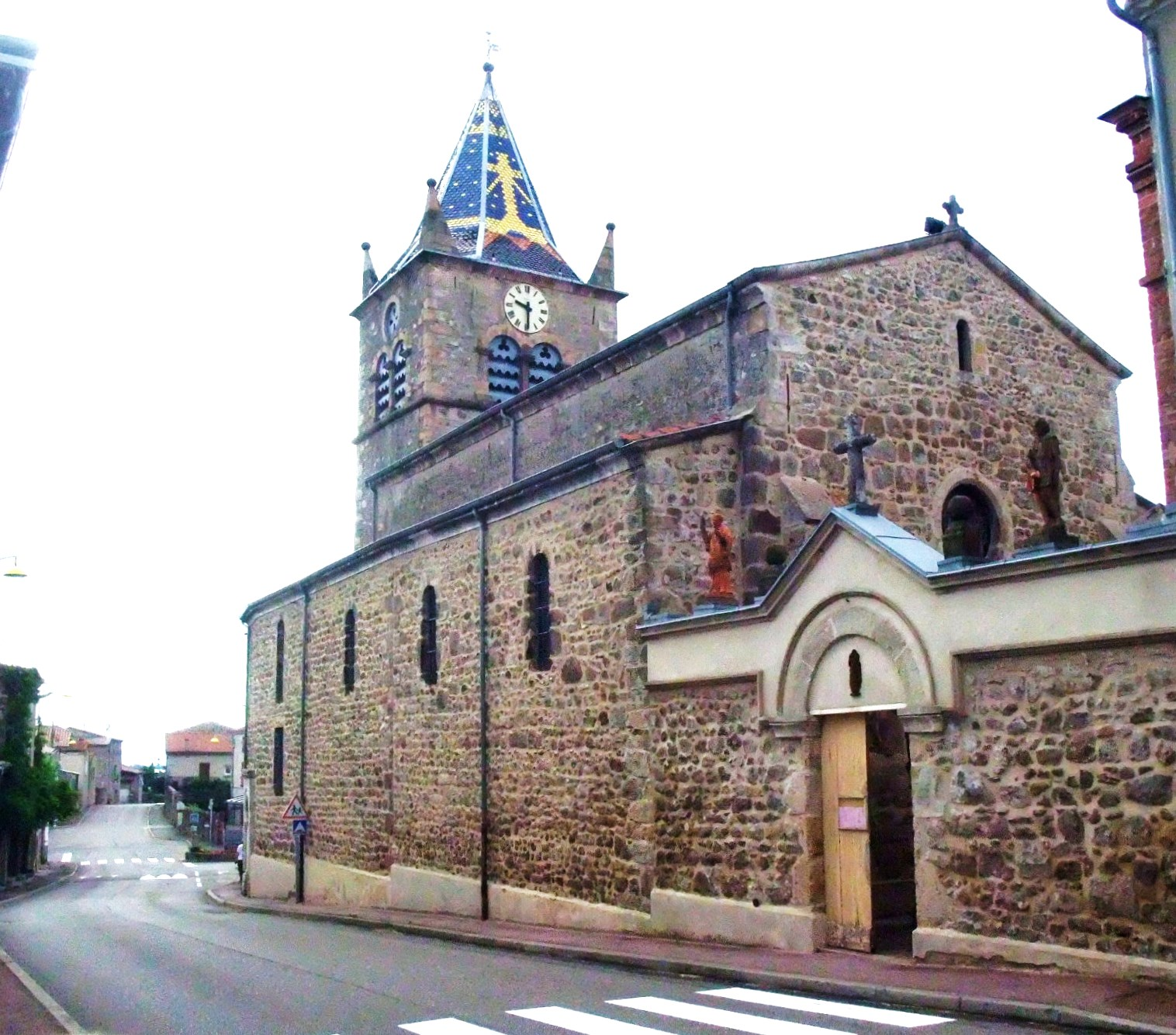
- The church in Saint-Cyr
- Location of Saint-Cyr
- Location within France Location within Auvergne-Rhône-Alpes
- Coordinates: 45°15′10″N 4°43′52″E
- Country: France
- Region: Auvergne-Rhône-Alpes
- Department: Ardèche
- Arrondissement: Tournon-sur-Rhône
- Canton: Annonay-1
- Intercommunality: Annonay Rhône Agglo

Government
  - Mayor (2024–2026): Isabelle Palluy
- Area^{1}: 8.12 km^{2} (3.14 sq mi)
- Highest elevation: 410 m (1,350 ft)
- Lowest elevation: 304 m (997 ft)
- Population (2023): 1,476
  - Density: 182/km^{2} (471/sq mi)
- Time zone: UTC+01:00 (CET)
  - Summer (DST): UTC+02:00 (CEST)
- INSEE/Postal code: 07227 /07430
- ^{1} French Land Register data, which excludes lakes, ponds, glaciers > 1 km^{2} (0.386 sq mi or 247 acres) and river estuaries.

Saint-Cyr (French pronunciation: [sɛ̃ siʁ]; Vivaro-Alpine: Sant Circ) is a commune in the Ardèche department in southern France.

== See also ==
- Communes of the Ardèche department
