= Félines, Ardèche =

Félines
- Commune
- Coat of arms
- Location of Félines
- Location within France Location within Auvergne-Rhône-Alpes
- Coordinates: 45°19′03″N 4°43′45″E
- Country: France
- Region: Auvergne-Rhône-Alpes
- Department: Ardèche
- Arrondissement: Tournon-sur-Rhône
- Canton: Sarras
- Intercommunality: Annonay Rhône Agglo

Government
  - Mayor (2021–2026): Lucie Ramier
- Area^{1}: 14 km^{2} (5.4 sq mi)
- Elevation: 400 m (1,300 ft)
- Highest elevation: 705 m (2,313 ft)
- Lowest elevation: 160 m (520 ft)
- Population (2023): 1,934
  - Density: 140/km^{2} (360/sq mi)
- Time zone: UTC+01:00 (CET)
  - Summer (DST): UTC+02:00 (CEST)
- INSEE/Postal code: 07089 /07340
- ^{1} French Land Register data, which excludes lakes, ponds, glaciers > 1 km^{2} (0.386 sq mi or 247 acres) and river estuaries.

Félines (French pronunciation: [felin]; Arpitan: Felyenes; Occitan: Gat) is a commune in the Ardèche department in southern France.

== Population ==
Historical population
Year	Pop.	±% p.a.
1968	524	—
1975	616	+2.34%
1982	714	+2.13%
1990	876	+2.59%
1999	1,106	+2.62%
2007	1,436	+3.32%
2012	1,493	+0.78%
2017	1,652	+2.04%
2023	1,934	+2.66%
Source: INSEE

== See also ==
- Communes of the Ardèche department
