= Savas, Ardèche =

Savas
- Commune
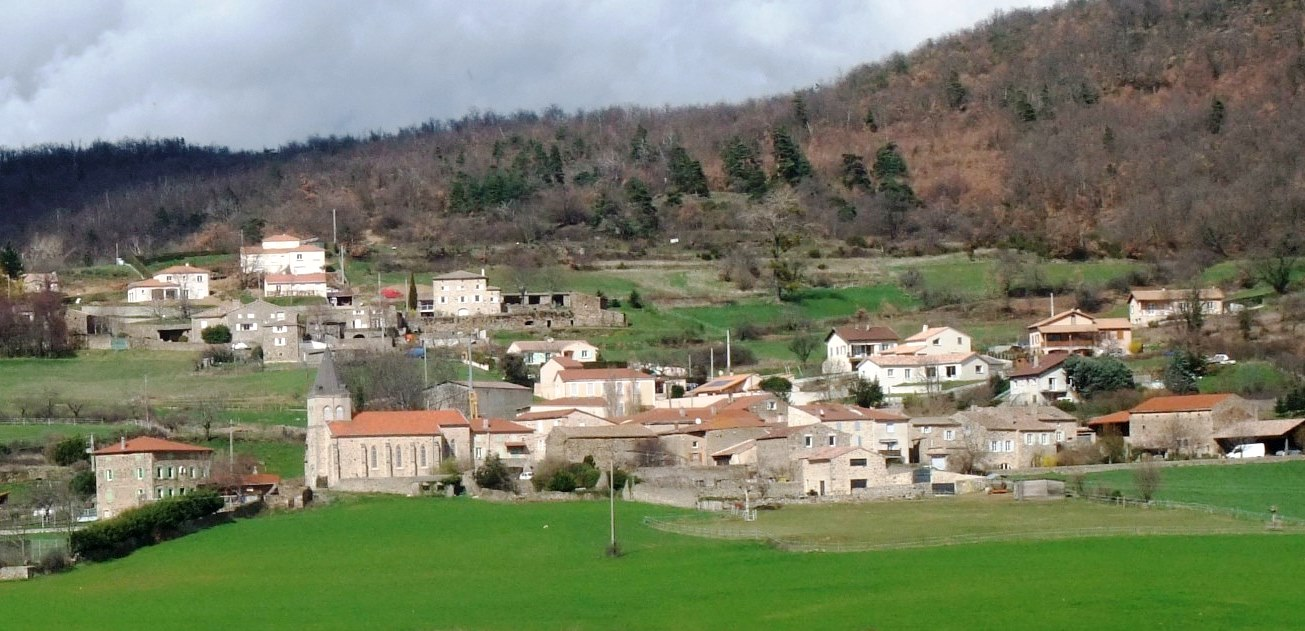
- A view of the village, including the church, town hall and private school
- Location of Savas
- Location within France Location within Auvergne-Rhône-Alpes
- Coordinates: 45°17′51″N 4°41′34″E
- Country: France
- Region: Auvergne-Rhône-Alpes
- Department: Ardèche
- Arrondissement: Tournon-sur-Rhône
- Canton: Annonay-1
- Intercommunality: Annonay Rhône Agglo

Government
  - Mayor (2020–2026): Yves Rulliere
- Area^{1}: 12.44 km^{2} (4.80 sq mi)
- Elevation: 550 m (1,800 ft)
- Highest elevation: 738 m (2,421 ft)
- Lowest elevation: 448 m (1,470 ft)
- Population (2023): 896
  - Density: 72.0/km^{2} (187/sq mi)
- Time zone: UTC+01:00 (CET)
  - Summer (DST): UTC+02:00 (CEST)
- INSEE/Postal code: 07310 /07430
- ^{1} French Land Register data, which excludes lakes, ponds, glaciers > 1 km^{2} (0.386 sq mi or 247 acres) and river estuaries.

Savas (Arpitan: Savâs) is a commune in the Ardèche department in southern France.

== Population ==
Historical population
Year	Pop.	±% p.a.
1968	282	—
1975	310	+1.36%
1982	508	+7.31%
1990	575	+1.56%
1999	694	+2.11%
2007	806	+1.89%
2012	852	+1.12%
2017	900	+1.10%
2023	896	−0.07%
Source: INSEE

== See also ==
- Communes of the Ardèche department
