= Boulieu-lès-Annonay =

- Commune
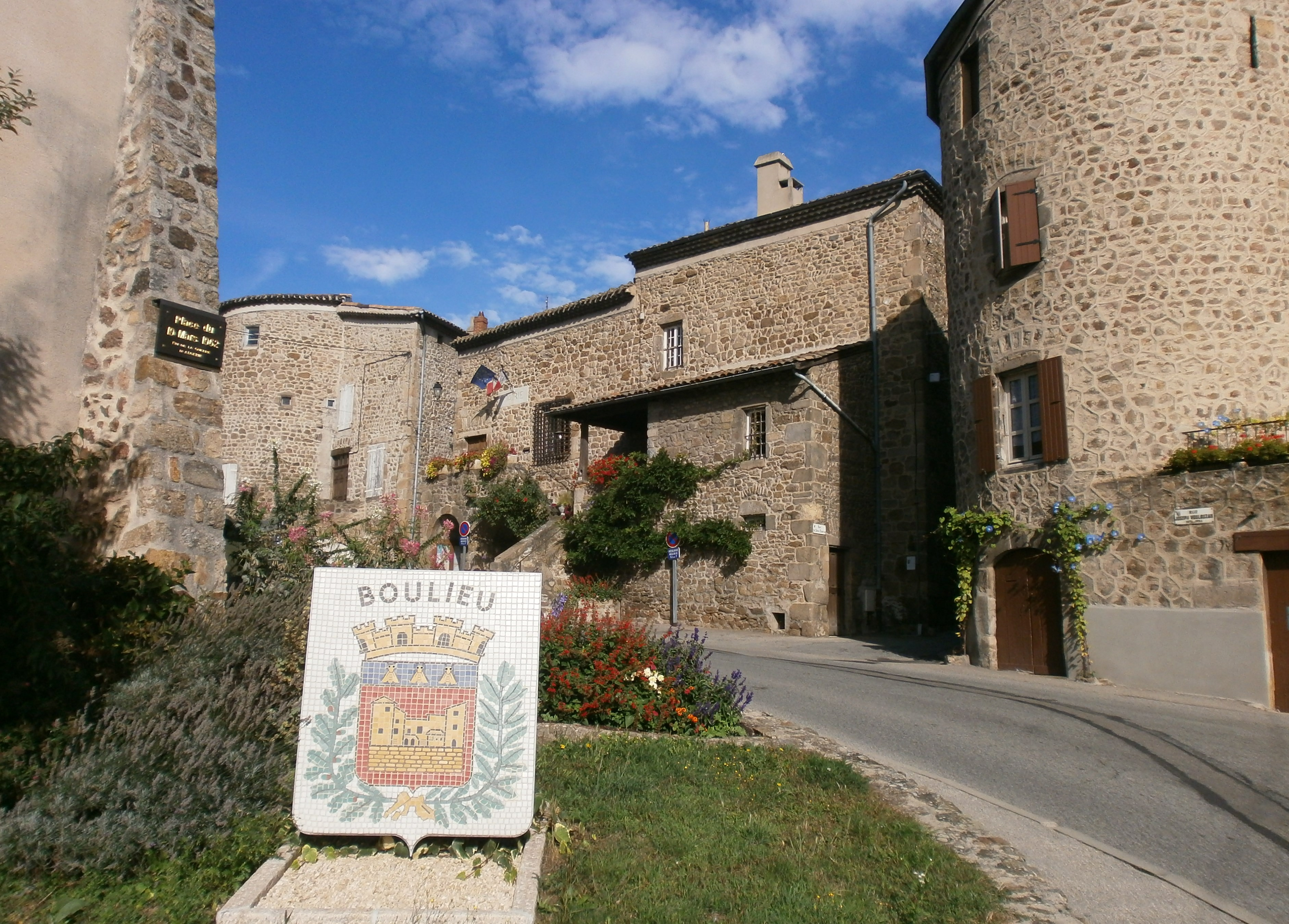
- The road into Boulieu-lès-Annonay

- Coat of arms
- Location of Boulieu-lès-Annonay
- Location within France Location within Auvergne-Rhône-Alpes
- Coordinates: 45°16′18″N 4°40′02″E
- Country: France
- Region: Auvergne-Rhône-Alpes
- Department: Ardèche
- Arrondissement: Tournon-sur-Rhône
- Canton: Annonay-1
- Intercommunality: Annonay Rhône Agglo

Government
  - Mayor (2020–2026): Damien Bayle
- Area^{1}: 9.45 km^{2} (3.65 sq mi)
- Highest elevation: 915 m (3,002 ft)
- Lowest elevation: 358 m (1,175 ft)
- Population (2023): 2,248
  - Density: 238/km^{2} (616/sq mi)
- Time zone: UTC+01:00 (CET)
  - Summer (DST): UTC+02:00 (CEST)
- INSEE/Postal code: 07041 /07100
- ^{1} French Land Register data, which excludes lakes, ponds, glaciers > 1 km^{2} (0.386 sq mi or 247 acres) and river estuaries.

Boulieu-lès-Annonay (French pronunciation: [buljø lɛ.z‿anɔnɛ], literally Boulieu near Annonay; Occitan: Bonluòc) is a commune in the Ardèche department in southern France.

== Population ==
Historical population
Year	Pop.	±% p.a.
1968	1,459	—
1975	1,666	+1.91%
1982	1,767	+0.84%
1990	1,942	+1.19%
1999	2,096	+0.85%
2007	2,075	−0.13%
2012	2,163	+0.83%
2017	2,300	+1.24%
2023	2,248	−0.38%
Source: INSEE

== See also ==
- Communes of the Ardèche department
