= Charnas =

- Commune
- Location of Charnas
- Location within France Location within Auvergne-Rhône-Alpes
- Coordinates: 45°20′14″N 4°44′40″E
- Country: France
- Region: Auvergne-Rhône-Alpes
- Department: Ardèche
- Arrondissement: Tournon-sur-Rhône
- Canton: Sarras
- Intercommunality: Annonay Rhône Agglo

Government
  - Mayor (2020–2026): Yves Fraysse
- Area^{1}: 5.39 km^{2} (2.08 sq mi)
- Elevation: 250 m (820 ft)
- Highest elevation: 398 m (1,306 ft)
- Lowest elevation: 141 m (463 ft)
- Population (2023): 925
  - Density: 172/km^{2} (444/sq mi)
- Time zone: UTC+01:00 (CET)
  - Summer (DST): UTC+02:00 (CEST)
- INSEE/Postal code: 07056 /07340
- ^{1} French Land Register data, which excludes lakes, ponds, glaciers > 1 km^{2} (0.386 sq mi or 247 acres) and river estuaries.

Charnas (Arpitan: Chânâs) is a commune in the Ardèche department in southern France.

== Location and Description ==
The commune of Charnas covers a relatively modest area of 5.39 km² on the edge of the northern Ardèche plateau, which overlooks the Rhône River. To the east, its territory lies between two streams: the Montrond to the north and the Marlet to the south. It is in this area that the village gradually expanded. To the northwest, the rest of the commune occupies the plateau, consisting of farmland and hamlets, extending to the Limony stream and the boundary between the Ardèche and Loire departments.

== Population ==
Historical population
Year	Pop.	±% p.a.
1968	264	—
1975	280	+0.84%
1982	297	+0.85%
1990	369	+2.75%
1999	511	+3.68%
2007	683	+3.69%
2012	865	+4.84%
2017	931	+1.48%
2023	925	−0.11%
Source: INSEE

== See also ==
- Communes of the Ardèche department
