= Roiffieux =

- Commune
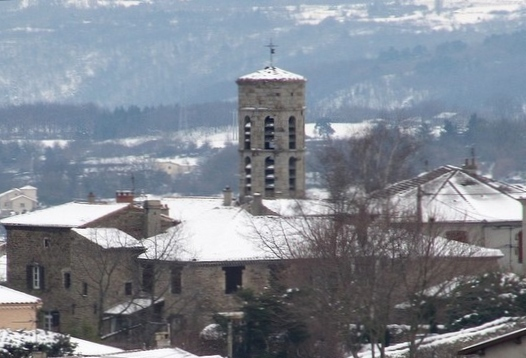
- The church in Roiffieux, in winter
- Location of Roiffieux
- Location within France Location within Auvergne-Rhône-Alpes
- Coordinates: 45°13′38″N 4°39′18″E
- Country: France
- Region: Auvergne-Rhône-Alpes
- Department: Ardèche
- Arrondissement: Tournon-sur-Rhône
- Canton: Annonay-2
- Intercommunality: Annonay Rhône Agglo

Government
  - Mayor (2020–2026): Christophe Delord
- Area^{1}: 19.52 km^{2} (7.54 sq mi)
- Elevation: 450 m (1,480 ft)
- Highest elevation: 957 m (3,140 ft)
- Lowest elevation: 240 m (790 ft)
- Population (2023): 2,743
  - Density: 140.5/km^{2} (364.0/sq mi)
- Time zone: UTC+01:00 (CET)
  - Summer (DST): UTC+02:00 (CEST)
- INSEE/Postal code: 07197 /07100
- ^{1} French Land Register data, which excludes lakes, ponds, glaciers > 1 km^{2} (0.386 sq mi or 247 acres) and river estuaries.

Roiffieux (French pronunciation: [ʁwafjø]; Occitan: Reifiòc) is a commune in the Ardèche department in southern France.

== Population ==
Historical population

| Year | Pop. | ±% p.a. |
|---|---|---|
| 1793 | 340 | — |
| 1800 | 729 | +11.51% |
| 1806 | 762 | +0.74% |
| 1821 | 832 | +0.59% |
| 1831 | 714 | −1.52% |
| 1836 | 884 | +4.36% |
| 1841 | 929 | +1.00% |
| 1846 | 1,013 | +1.75% |
| 1851 | 1,043 | +0.59% |
| 1856 | 1,028 | −0.29% |
| 1861 | 1,040 | +0.23% |
| 1866 | 1,067 | +0.51% |
| 1872 | 1,078 | +0.17% |
| 1876 | 1,088 | +0.23% |
| 1881 | 1,092 | +0.07% |
| 1886 | 1,090 | −0.04% |
| 1891 | 1,117 | +0.49% |
| 1896 | 1,100 | −0.31% |
| 1901 | 1,103 | +0.05% |

| Year | Pop. | ±% p.a. |
|---|---|---|
| 1906 | 1,140 | +0.66% |
| 1911 | 1,148 | +0.14% |
| 1921 | 956 | −1.81% |
| 1926 | 904 | −1.11% |
| 1931 | 938 | +0.74% |
| 1936 | 905 | −0.71% |
| 1946 | 925 | +0.22% |
| 1954 | 925 | +0.00% |
| 1962 | 872 | −0.73% |
| 1968 | 1,181 | +5.19% |
| 1975 | 1,761 | +5.87% |
| 1982 | 2,180 | +3.10% |
| 1990 | 2,285 | +0.59% |
| 1999 | 2,453 | +0.79% |
| 2007 | 2,675 | +1.09% |
| 2012 | 2,794 | +0.87% |
| 2017 | 2,785 | −0.06% |
| 2023 | 2,743 | −0.25% |

Source: EHESS and INSEE (1968-2023)

== See also ==
- Communes of the Ardèche department
