= Canton of Sarras =

Coordinates: 45.19°N 4.80°E

- Canton
- Situation of the canton of Sarras in the department of Ardèche
- Country: France
- Region: Auvergne-Rhône-Alpes
- Department: Ardèche
- No. of communes: {{{nbcomm}}}
- Population (2023): 16,787
- INSEE code: 0711

The canton of Sarras is an administrative division of the Ardèche department, southern France. It was created at the French canton reorganisation which came into effect in March 2015. Its seat is in Sarras.

It consists of the following communes:

1. Andance
2. Arras-sur-Rhône
3. Bogy
4. Brossainc
5. Champagne
6. Charnas
7. Colombier-le-Cardinal
8. Eclassan
9. Félines
10. Limony
11. Ozon
12. Peaugres
13. Peyraud
14. Saint-Désirat
15. Saint-Étienne-de-Valoux
16. Saint-Jacques-d'Atticieux
17. Sarras
18. Serrières
19. Vinzieux
