= Limony =

- Commune
- Coat of arms
- Location of Limony
- Location within France Location within Auvergne-Rhône-Alpes
- Coordinates: 45°21′10″N 4°45′30″E
- Country: France
- Region: Auvergne-Rhône-Alpes
- Department: Ardèche
- Arrondissement: Tournon-sur-Rhône
- Canton: Sarras
- Intercommunality: Annonay Rhône Agglo

Government
  - Mayor (2020–2026): Richard Molina
- Area^{1}: 7.22 km^{2} (2.79 sq mi)
- Elevation: 142 m (466 ft)
- Highest elevation: 396 m (1,299 ft)
- Lowest elevation: 134 m (440 ft)
- Population (2023): 833
  - Density: 115/km^{2} (299/sq mi)
- Time zone: UTC+01:00 (CET)
  - Summer (DST): UTC+02:00 (CEST)
- INSEE/Postal code: 07143 /07340
- ^{1} French Land Register data, which excludes lakes, ponds, glaciers > 1 km^{2} (0.386 sq mi or 247 acres) and river estuaries.

Limony (French pronunciation: [limɔni]; Arpitan: Lemoniô; Occitan: Limòni) is a commune in the Ardèche department in southern France.

== Population ==
Historical population
| Year | Pop. | ±% p.a. |
|---|---|---|
| 1968 | 529 | — |
| 1975 | 482 | −1.32% |
| 1982 | 544 | +1.74% |
| 1990 | 548 | +0.09% |
| 1999 | 606 | +1.12% |
| 2007 | 754 | +2.77% |
| 2012 | 715 | −1.06% |
| 2017 | 758 | +1.17% |
| 2023 | 833 | +1.58% |
Source: INSEE

== See also ==
- Communes of the Ardèche department
