= Eclassan =

- Commune
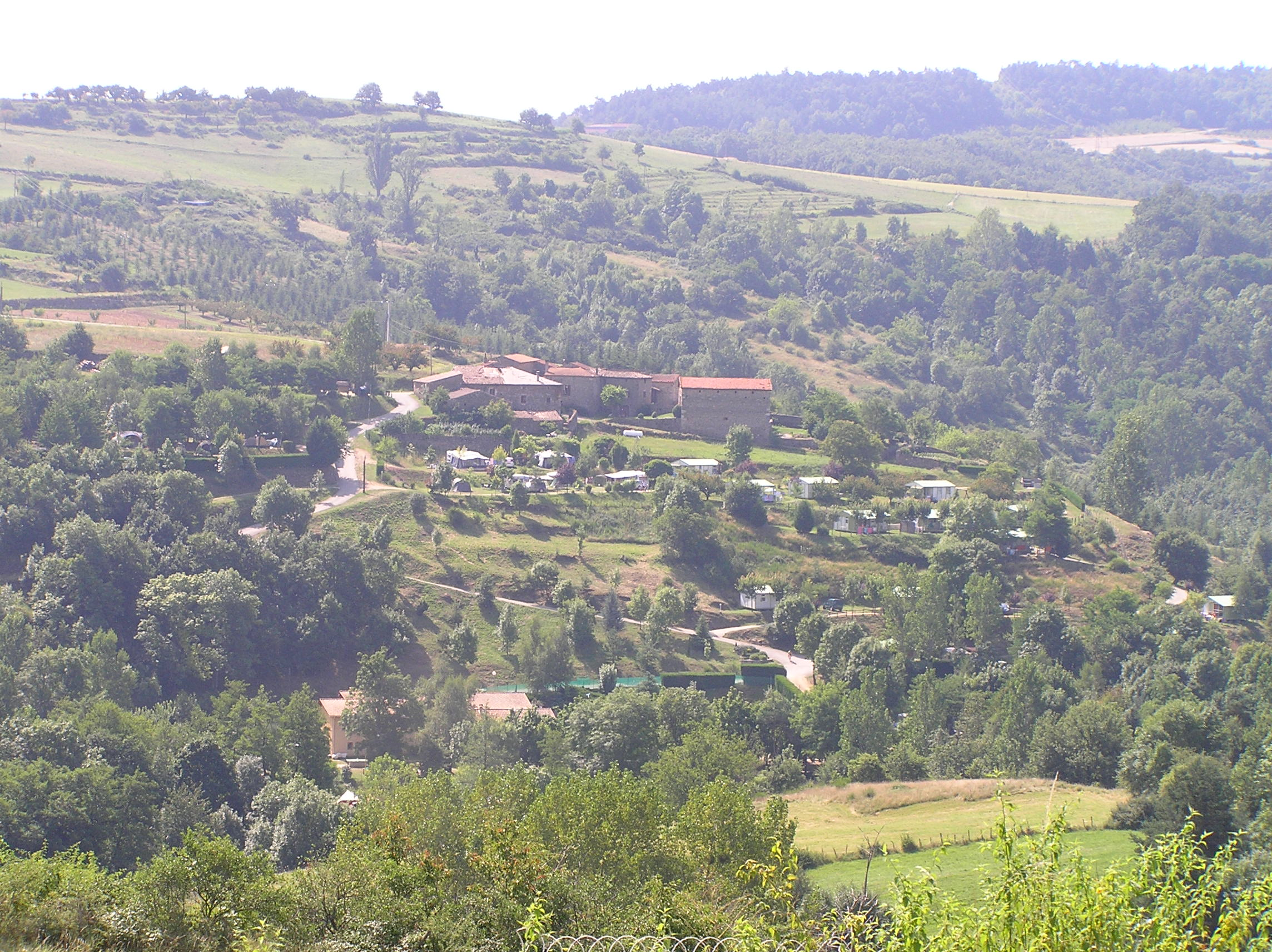
- Petit Chaleat, in Eclassan
- Location of Eclassan
- Location within France Location within Auvergne-Rhône-Alpes
- Coordinates: 45°09′32″N 4°45′43″E
- Country: France
- Region: Auvergne-Rhône-Alpes
- Department: Ardèche
- Arrondissement: Tournon-sur-Rhône
- Canton: Sarras

Government
  - Mayor (2021–2026): Pierre Madinier
- Area^{1}: 15.93 km^{2} (6.15 sq mi)
- Elevation: 400 m (1,300 ft)
- Highest elevation: 530 m (1,740 ft)
- Lowest elevation: 273 m (896 ft)
- Population (2023): 1,054
  - Density: 66.16/km^{2} (171.4/sq mi)
- Time zone: UTC+01:00 (CET)
  - Summer (DST): UTC+02:00 (CEST)
- INSEE/Postal code: 07084 /07370
- ^{1} French Land Register data, which excludes lakes, ponds, glaciers > 1 km^{2} (0.386 sq mi or 247 acres) and river estuaries.

Eclassan (French pronunciation: [eklasɑ̃]; also Éclassan) is a commune in the Ardèche department in southern France.

== Population ==
Historical population
| Year | Pop. | ±% p.a. |
|---|---|---|
| 1968 | 598 | — |
| 1975 | 533 | −1.63% |
| 1982 | 573 | +1.04% |
| 1990 | 633 | +1.25% |
| 1999 | 702 | +1.16% |
| 2007 | 833 | +2.16% |
| 2012 | 980 | +3.30% |
| 2017 | 1,025 | +0.90% |
| 2023 | 1,054 | +0.47% |
Source: INSEE

== See also ==
- Communes of the Ardèche department
