= Saint-Marcel-lès-Annonay =

- Commune
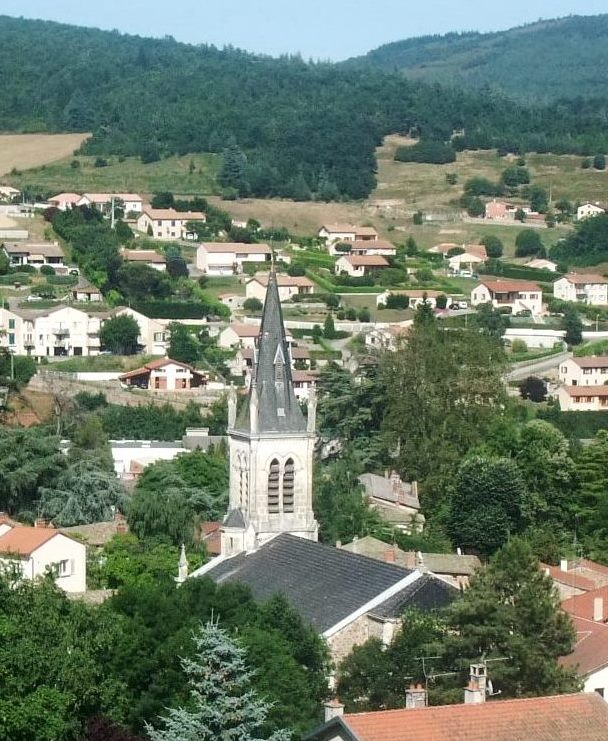
- The church and surrounding buildings in Saint-Marcel-lès-Annonay
- Location of Saint-Marcel-lès-Annonay
- Location within France Location within Auvergne-Rhône-Alpes
- Coordinates: 45°17′13″N 4°37′37″E
- Country: France
- Region: Auvergne-Rhône-Alpes
- Department: Ardèche
- Arrondissement: Tournon-sur-Rhône
- Canton: Annonay-1
- Intercommunality: Annonay Rhône Agglo

Government
  - Mayor (2020–2026): Laurence Dumas
- Area^{1}: 16.61 km^{2} (6.41 sq mi)
- Highest elevation: 860 m (2,820 ft)
- Lowest elevation: 411 m (1,348 ft)
- Population (2023): 1,357
  - Density: 81.70/km^{2} (211.6/sq mi)
- Time zone: UTC+01:00 (CET)
  - Summer (DST): UTC+02:00 (CEST)
- INSEE/Postal code: 07265 /07100
- ^{1} French Land Register data, which excludes lakes, ponds, glaciers > 1 km^{2} (0.386 sq mi or 247 acres) and river estuaries.

Saint-Marcel-lès-Annonay (French pronunciation: [sɛ̃ maʁsɛl lɛ.z‿anɔnɛ]; Occitan: Sant Marcèl d'ès Anonai) is a commune in the Ardèche department in southern France.

The village was founded in 972. The Deûme passes through Saint-Marcel and flows into the Cance with Annonay. Water from these rivers come from the granitic areas and is very pure. Their patent rights have been recognized for several centuries with the rise of paper mills. The paper mills of Annonay by Montgolfier-Canson formed only two groups in the 18th century from Vidalon and Faya-Largeau.

In 1805, Jean-Baptiste de Montgolfier was detached from Vidalon to create a factory in Saint-Marcel. Paper production was a large contributor to the rise of the commune and was the main industry for a long period of time. The employees of paper mills were called les usines, French for factory and formed the integral part of their culture and life.

The small commune formed only industrial and is residential today, the monumental buildings mixed with modern buildings.

== See also ==
- Communes of the Ardèche department
