= Saint-Désirat =

- Commune
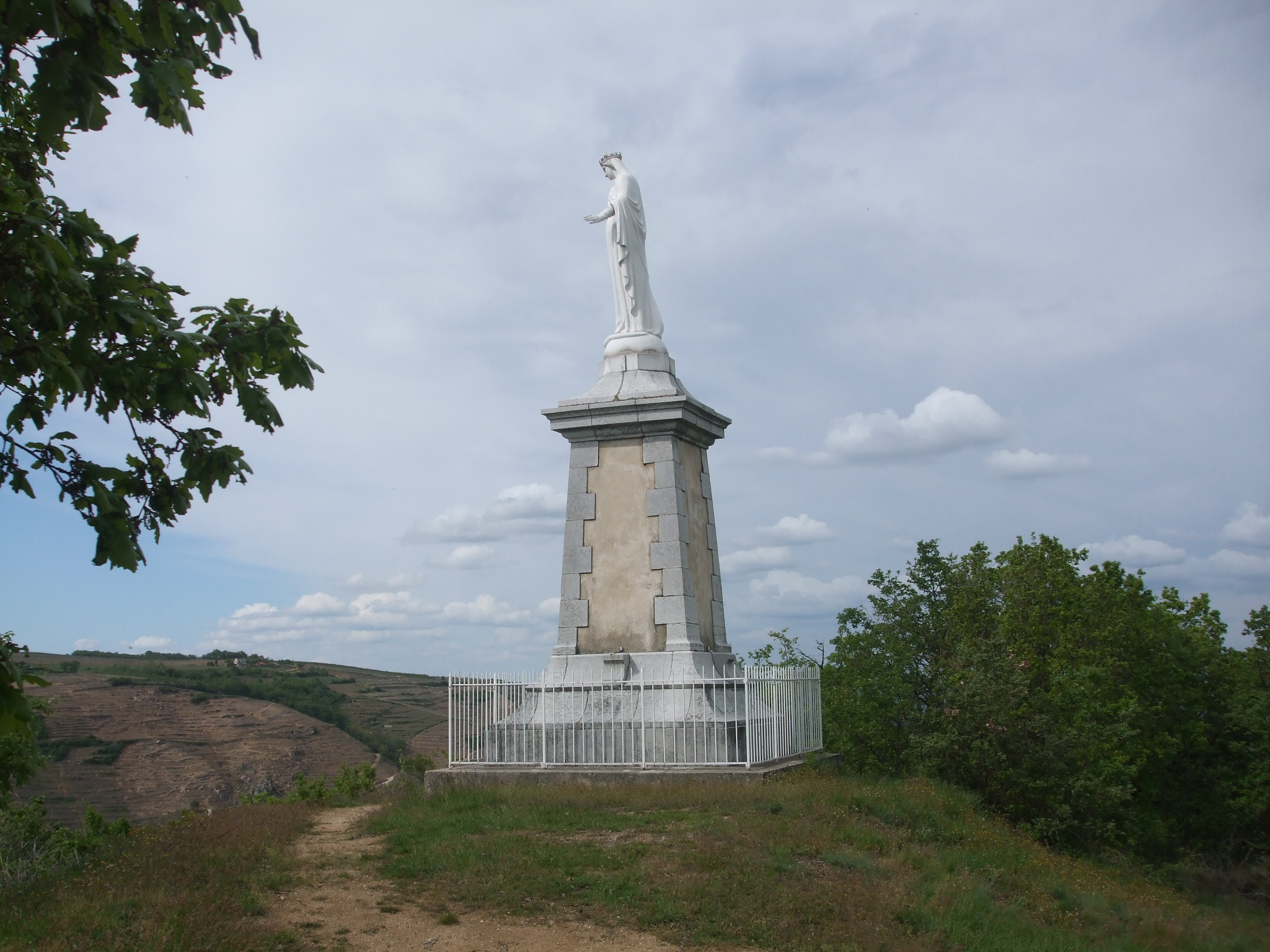
- Statue of the Virgin, in Saint-Désirat
- Location of Saint-Désirat
- Location within France Location within Auvergne-Rhône-Alpes
- Coordinates: 45°15′25″N 4°47′09″E
- Country: France
- Region: Auvergne-Rhône-Alpes
- Department: Ardèche
- Arrondissement: Tournon-sur-Rhône
- Canton: Sarras
- Intercommunality: Annonay Rhône Agglo

Government
  - Mayor (2020–2026): Thierry Lermet
- Area^{1}: 7.31 km^{2} (2.82 sq mi)
- Elevation: 136 m (446 ft)
- Highest elevation: 382 m (1,253 ft)
- Lowest elevation: 136 m (446 ft)
- Population (2023): 891
  - Density: 122/km^{2} (316/sq mi)
- Time zone: UTC+01:00 (CET)
  - Summer (DST): UTC+02:00 (CEST)
- INSEE/Postal code: 07228 /07340
- ^{1} French Land Register data, which excludes lakes, ponds, glaciers > 1 km^{2} (0.386 sq mi or 247 acres) and river estuaries.

Saint-Désirat (French pronunciation: [sɛ̃ deziʁa]; Vivaro-Alpine: Sant Desirat) is a commune in the Ardèche department in the Auvergne-Rhône-Alpes region in southern France.

== Population ==
Historical population
Year	Pop.	±% p.a.
1968	621	—
1975	593	−0.66%
1982	608	+0.36%
1990	660	+1.03%
1999	707	+0.77%
2007	758	+0.87%
2012	853	+2.39%
2017	877	+0.56%
2023	891	+0.26%
Source: INSEE

== See also ==
- Communes of the Ardèche department
