= Safari de Peaugres =

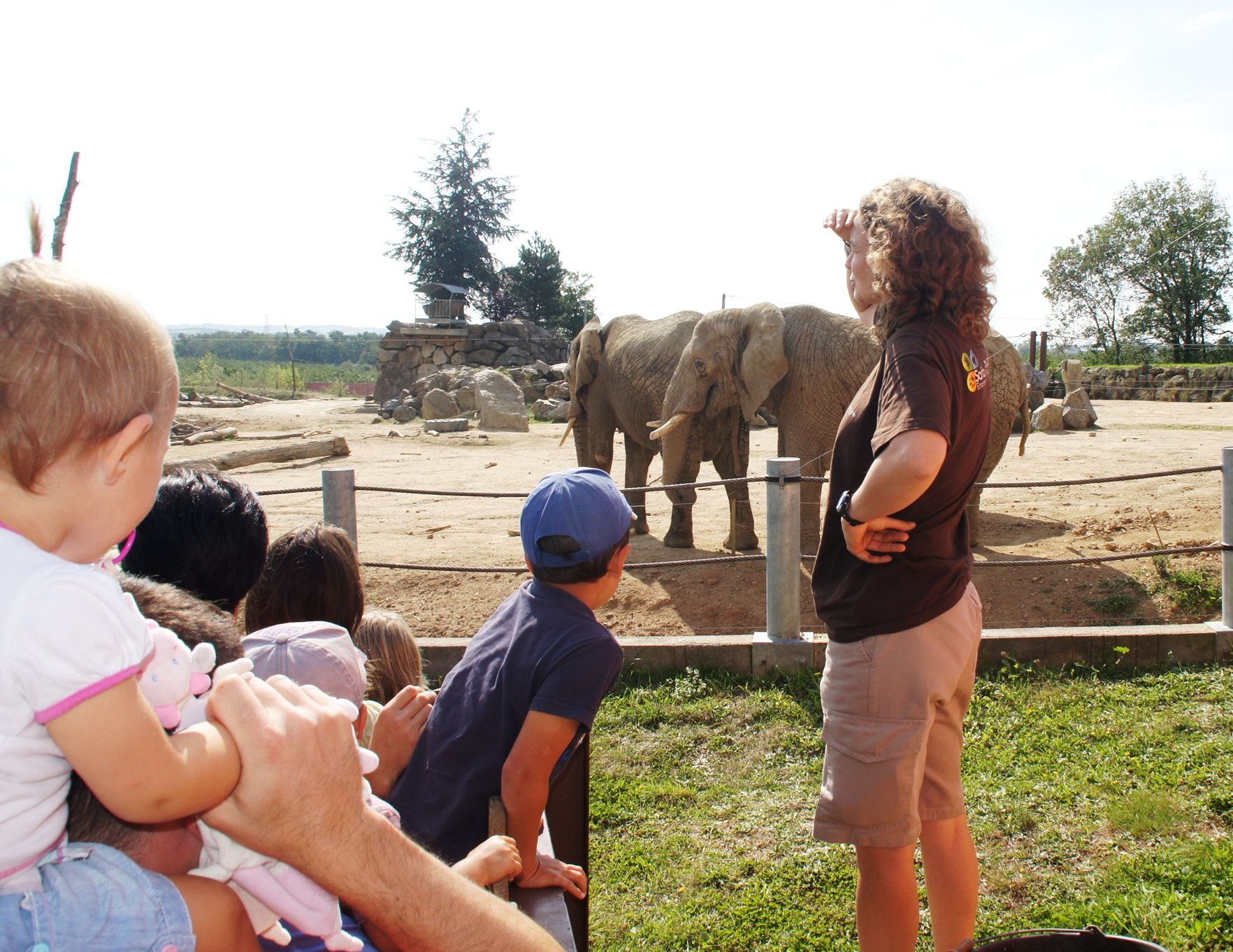
- Interactive map of Safari de Peaugres
- 45.2691°N 4.7170°E
- Date opened: 1974
- Location: Peaugres, Ardèche, France
- Land area: 80 Ha
- No. of animals: 1200
- No. of species: 135
- Website: http://www.safari-peaugres.com

Safari de Peaugres is an 80 ha zoo in the Peaugres area of Auvergne-Rhône-Alpes, near Annonay. It is one of the largest tourist attractions in departement of Ardèche. The zoo presents 800 animals from 120 species. Monkey World have rescued a white-faced saki female from here called Chloe in 2016.

The zoo is a member of the European Association of Zoos and Aquaria (EAZA) and the World Association of Zoos and Aquariums (WAZA).
