= Monestier, Ardèche =

Monestier
- Commune
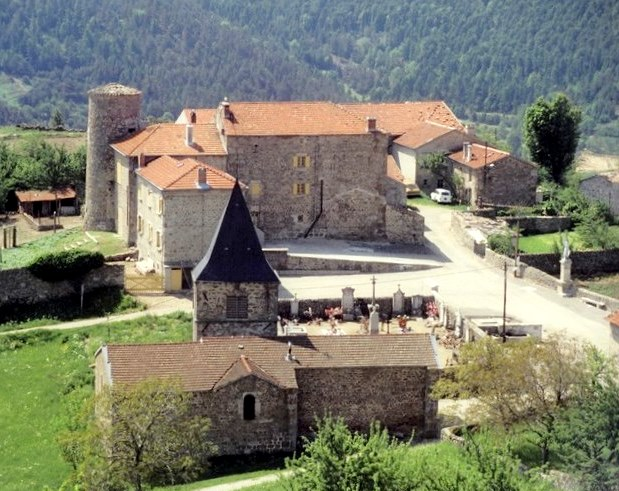
- The church and chateau in Monestier
- Location of Monestier
- Location within France Location within Auvergne-Rhône-Alpes
- Coordinates: 45°11′58″N 4°31′55″E
- Country: France
- Region: Auvergne-Rhône-Alpes
- Department: Ardèche
- Arrondissement: Tournon-sur-Rhône
- Canton: Annonay-2
- Intercommunality: Annonay Rhône Agglo

Government
  - Mayor (2021–2026): Agnès Lory
- Area^{1}: 7.41 km^{2} (2.86 sq mi)
- Elevation: 800 m (2,600 ft)
- Highest elevation: 1,388 m (4,554 ft)
- Lowest elevation: 617 m (2,024 ft)
- Population (2023): 58
  - Density: 7.8/km^{2} (20/sq mi)
- Time zone: UTC+01:00 (CET)
  - Summer (DST): UTC+02:00 (CEST)
- INSEE/Postal code: 07160 /07690
- ^{1} French Land Register data, which excludes lakes, ponds, glaciers > 1 km^{2} (0.386 sq mi or 247 acres) and river estuaries.

Monestier (French pronunciation: [mɔnɛstje]; Occitan: Lo Moniteir) is a commune in the Ardèche department in southern France. This village is extended on 7.414 km^{2}. It is located in a mountainous area, between 617m and 1387m elevation.

== Population ==
Historical population
Year	Pop.	±% p.a.
1968	91	—
1975	65	−4.69%
1982	65	+0.00%
1990	52	−2.75%
1999	65	+2.51%
2007	56	−1.85%
2012	48	−3.04%
2017	61	+4.91%
2023	58	−0.84%
Source: INSEE

== See also ==
- Communes of the Ardèche department
