= Saint-Julien-Vocance =

- Commune
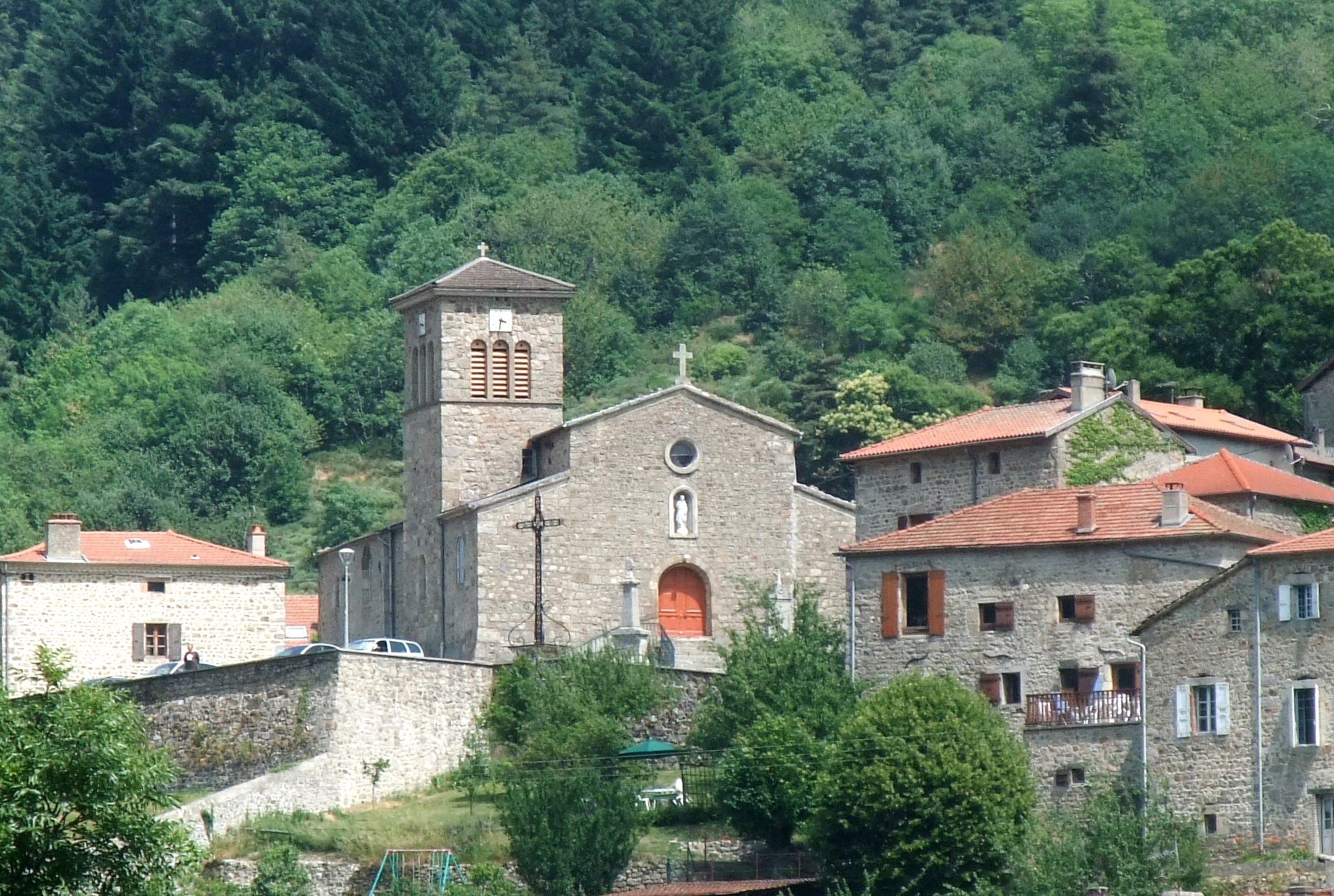
- The church and surrounding buildings in Saint-Julien-Vocance
- Location of Saint-Julien-Vocance
- Location within France Location within Auvergne-Rhône-Alpes
- Coordinates: 45°10′34″N 4°30′14″E
- Country: France
- Region: Auvergne-Rhône-Alpes
- Department: Ardèche
- Arrondissement: Tournon-sur-Rhône
- Canton: Annonay-2
- Intercommunality: Annonay Rhône Agglo

Government
  - Mayor (2020–2026): Christian Archier
- Area^{1}: 26.42 km^{2} (10.20 sq mi)
- Elevation: 670 m (2,200 ft)
- Highest elevation: 1,388 m (4,554 ft)
- Lowest elevation: 569 m (1,867 ft)
- Population (2023): 221
  - Density: 8.36/km^{2} (21.7/sq mi)
- Time zone: UTC+01:00 (CET)
  - Summer (DST): UTC+02:00 (CEST)
- INSEE/Postal code: 07258 /07690
- ^{1} French Land Register data, which excludes lakes, ponds, glaciers > 1 km^{2} (0.386 sq mi or 247 acres) and river estuaries.

Saint-Julien-Vocance (French pronunciation: [sɛ̃ ʒyljɛ̃ vɔkɑ̃s]; Vivaro-Alpine: Sant Julian de Vocança) is a commune in the Ardèche department in southern France.

== Population ==
Historical population
Year	Pop.	±% p.a.
1968	370	—
1975	279	−3.95%
1982	269	−0.52%
1990	245	−1.16%
1999	241	−0.18%
2007	259	+0.90%
2012	232	−2.18%
2017	227	−0.43%
2023	221	−0.45%
Source: INSEE

== See also ==
- Communes of the Ardèche department
