= Serrières, Ardèche =

Serrières
- Commune
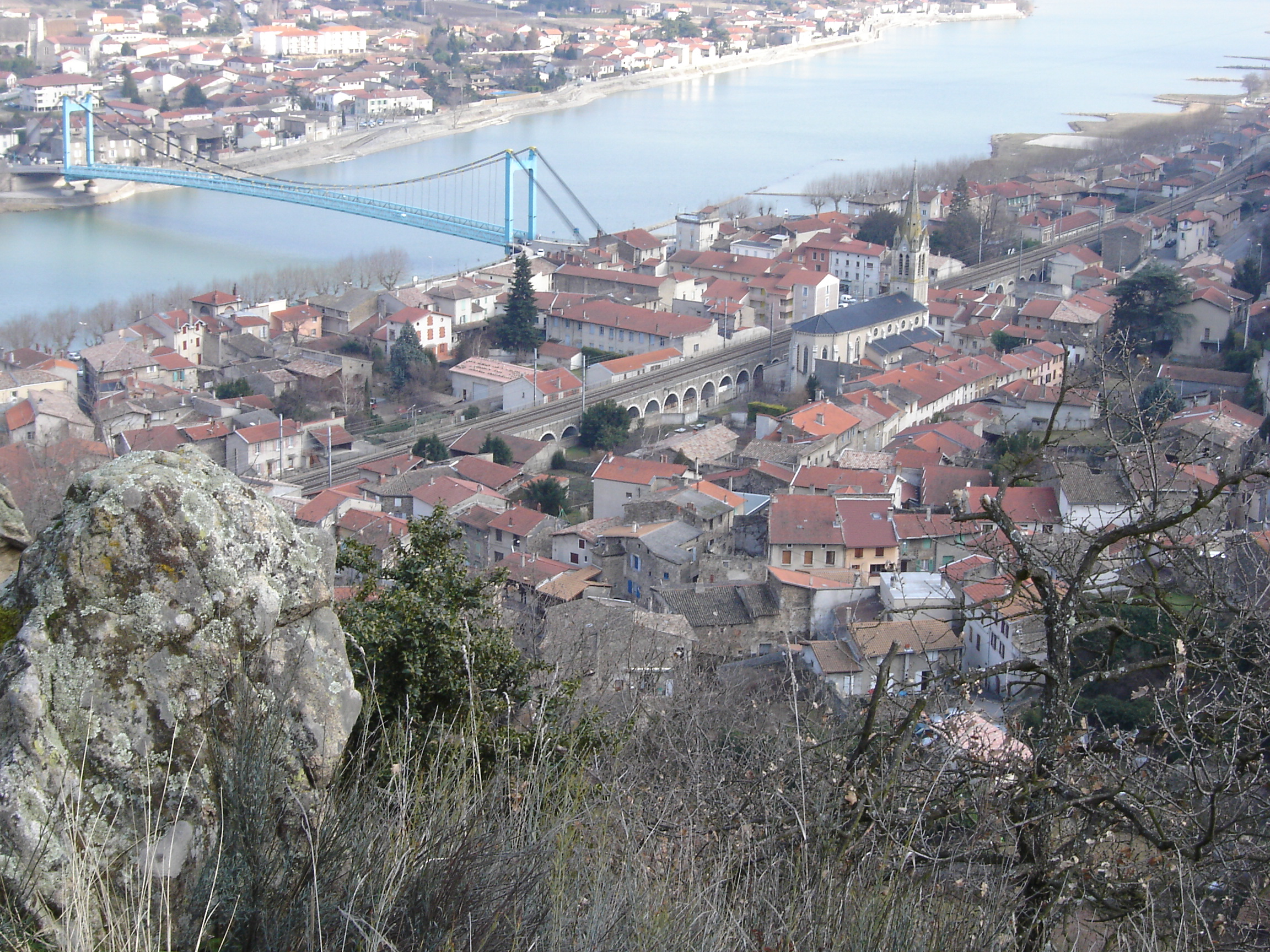
- A view of Serrières including the church, railway and suspension bridge

- Coat of arms
- Location of Serrières
- Location within France Location within Auvergne-Rhône-Alpes
- Coordinates: 45°19′08″N 4°45′50″E
- Country: France
- Region: Auvergne-Rhône-Alpes
- Department: Ardèche
- Arrondissement: Tournon-sur-Rhône
- Canton: Sarras
- Intercommunality: Annonay Rhône Agglo

Government
  - Mayor (2020–2026): Laurent Torgue
- Area^{1}: 3.96 km^{2} (1.53 sq mi)
- Highest elevation: 371 m (1,217 ft)
- Lowest elevation: 135 m (443 ft)
- Population (2023): 1,095
  - Density: 277/km^{2} (716/sq mi)
- Time zone: UTC+01:00 (CET)
  - Summer (DST): UTC+02:00 (CEST)
- INSEE/Postal code: 07313 /07340
- ^{1} French Land Register data, which excludes lakes, ponds, glaciers > 1 km^{2} (0.386 sq mi or 247 acres) and river estuaries.

Serrières (French pronunciation: [sɛʁjɛʁ]; Occitan: Serreira) is a commune in the Ardèche department in southern France.

== Population ==
Historical population
Year	Pop.	±% p.a.
1968	1,562	—
1975	1,388	−1.67%
1982	1,314	−0.78%
1990	1,154	−1.61%
1999	1,078	−0.75%
2007	1,159	+0.91%
2012	1,133	−0.45%
2017	1,146	+0.23%
2023	1,095	−0.76%
Source: INSEE

== See also ==
- Communes of the Ardèche department
- List of medieval bridges in France
