= Vernosc-lès-Annonay =

- Commune
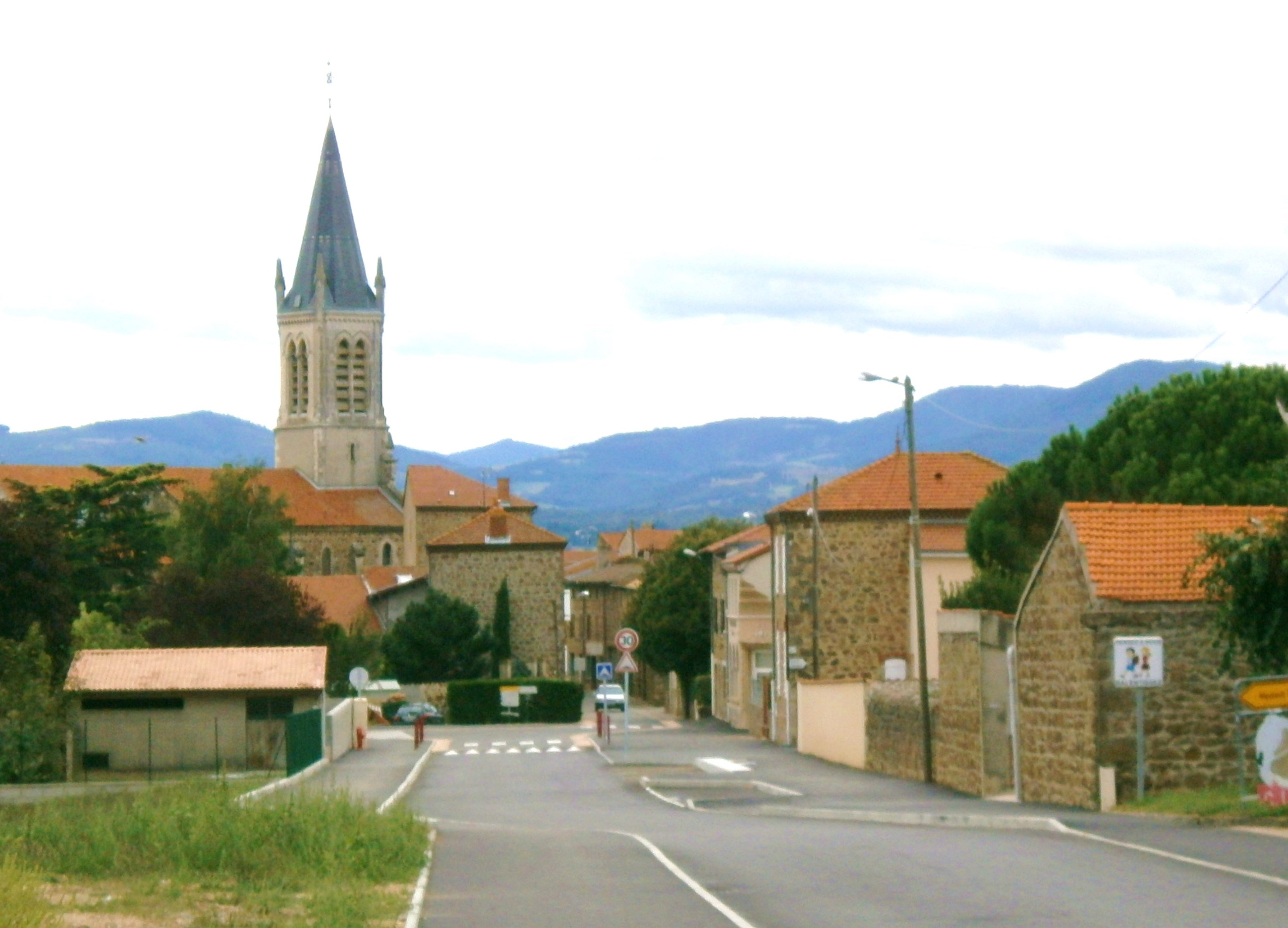
- The road into Vernosc-lès-Annonay
- Location of Vernosc-lès-Annonay
- Location within France Location within Auvergne-Rhône-Alpes
- Coordinates: 45°13′01″N 4°42′50″E
- Country: France
- Region: Auvergne-Rhône-Alpes
- Department: Ardèche
- Arrondissement: Tournon-sur-Rhône
- Canton: Annonay-2
- Intercommunality: Annonay Rhône Agglo

Government
  - Mayor (2020–2026): Patrick Olagne
- Area^{1}: 16.08 km^{2} (6.21 sq mi)
- Elevation: 371 m (1,217 ft)
- Highest elevation: 427 m (1,401 ft)
- Lowest elevation: 182 m (597 ft)
- Population (2023): 2,725
  - Density: 169.5/km^{2} (438.9/sq mi)
- Time zone: UTC+01:00 (CET)
  - Summer (DST): UTC+02:00 (CEST)
- INSEE/Postal code: 07337 /07430
- ^{1} French Land Register data, which excludes lakes, ponds, glaciers > 1 km^{2} (0.386 sq mi or 247 acres) and river estuaries.

Vernosc-lès-Annonay (French pronunciation: [vɛʁnɔsk lɛ.z‿anɔnɛ], literally Vernosc near Annonay; Occitan: Vernòsc) is a commune in the Ardèche department in southern France.

== Population ==
Historical population
Year	Pop.	±% p.a.
1968	677	—
1975	951	+4.97%
1982	1,307	+4.65%
1990	1,527	+1.96%
1999	1,679	+1.06%
2007	2,153	+3.16%
2012	2,280	+1.15%
2017	2,647	+3.03%
2023	2,725	+0.49%
Source: INSEE

== See also ==
- Communes of the Ardèche department
