= Saint-Étienne-de-Valoux =

- Commune
- Location of Saint-Étienne-de-Valoux
- Location within France Location within Auvergne-Rhône-Alpes
- Coordinates: 45°14′52″N 4°46′58″E
- Country: France
- Region: Auvergne-Rhône-Alpes
- Department: Ardèche
- Arrondissement: Tournon-sur-Rhône
- Canton: Sarras

Government
  - Mayor (2020–2026): Marie-Christine Soulhiard
- Area^{1}: 2.36 km^{2} (0.91 sq mi)
- Elevation: 168 m (551 ft)
- Highest elevation: 388 m (1,273 ft)
- Lowest elevation: 155 m (509 ft)
- Population (2023): 263
  - Density: 111/km^{2} (289/sq mi)
- Time zone: UTC+01:00 (CET)
  - Summer (DST): UTC+02:00 (CEST)
- INSEE/Postal code: 07234 /07340
- ^{1} French Land Register data, which excludes lakes, ponds, glaciers > 1 km^{2} (0.386 sq mi or 247 acres) and river estuaries.

Saint-Étienne-de-Valoux (French pronunciation: [sɛ̃.t‿etjɛn də valu]; Vivaro-Alpine: Sant Estève de Valós) is a commune in the Ardèche department in southern France.

== Population ==
Historical population
Year	Pop.	±% p.a.
1968	217	—
1975	218	+0.07%
1982	216	−0.13%
1990	200	−0.96%
1999	200	+0.00%
2007	283	+4.43%
2012	287	+0.28%
2017	294	+0.48%
2023	263	−1.84%
Source: INSEE

== See also ==
- Communes of the Ardèche department
