= Andancette =

- Commune
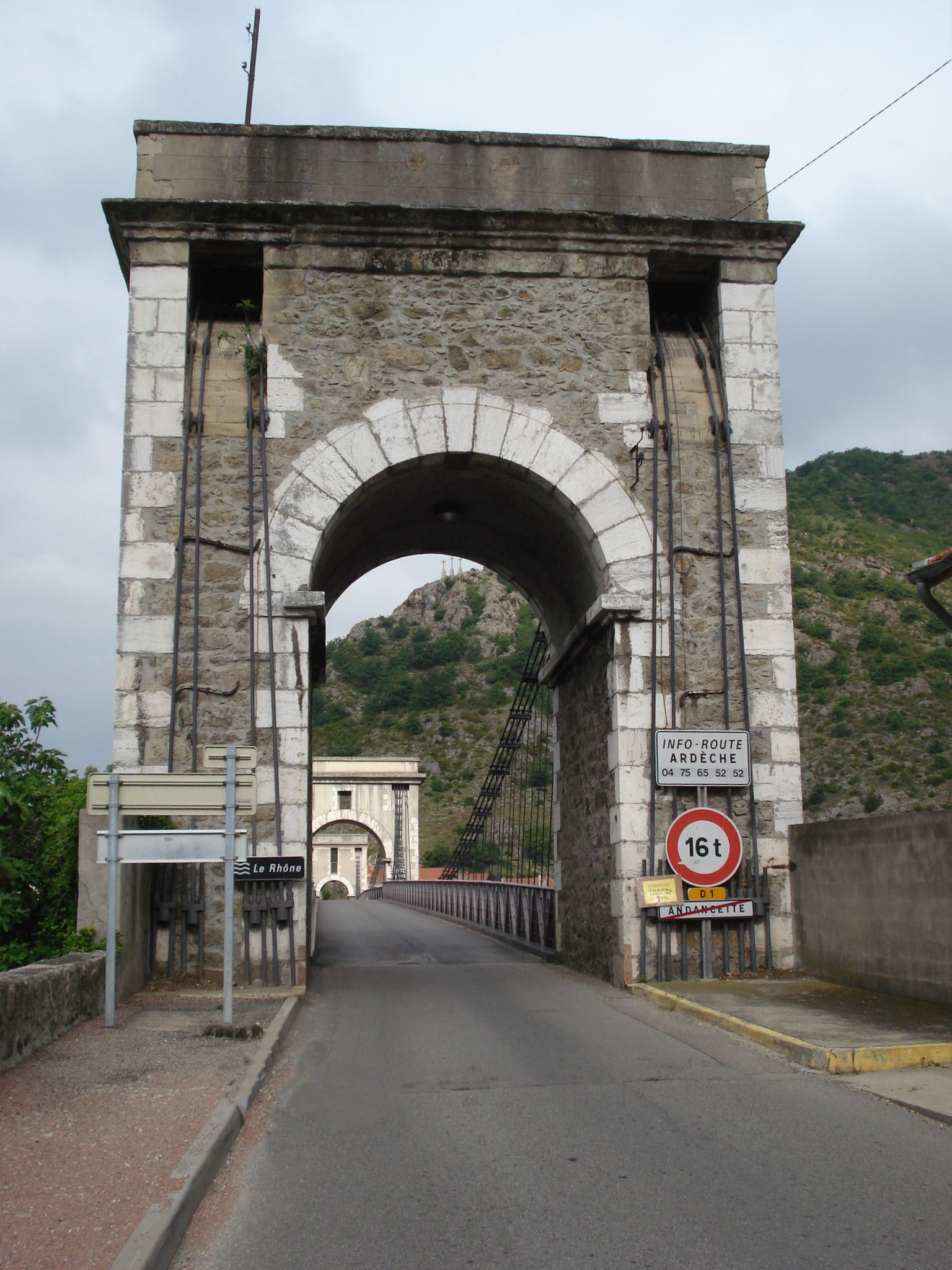
- The Marc Seguin suspension bridge over the Rhône

- Coat of arms
- Location of Andancette
- Location within France Location within Auvergne-Rhône-Alpes
- Coordinates: 45°14′34″N 4°48′27″E
- Country: France
- Region: Auvergne-Rhône-Alpes
- Department: Drôme
- Arrondissement: Valence
- Canton: Saint-Vallier
- Intercommunality: Porte de DrômArdèche

Government
  - Mayor (2020–2026): Frédéric Chenevier
- Area^{1}: 5.98 km^{2} (2.31 sq mi)
- Elevation: 138 m (453 ft)
- Highest elevation: 168 m (551 ft)
- Lowest elevation: 129 m (423 ft)
- Population (2023): 1,330
  - Density: 222/km^{2} (576/sq mi)
- Time zone: UTC+01:00 (CET)
  - Summer (DST): UTC+02:00 (CEST)
- INSEE/Postal code: 26009 /26140
- ^{1} French Land Register data, which excludes lakes, ponds, glaciers > 1 km^{2} (0.386 sq mi or 247 acres) and river estuaries.

Andancette (French pronunciation: [ɑ̃dɑ̃sɛt]) is a commune in the Drôme department in southeastern France.

== Geography ==
Andancette is located:

- 6 km (3.7 mi) from Saint-Rambert-d'Albon
- 6 km (3.7 mi) from Saint-Vallier
- 30 km (19 mi) from Valence

== Population ==
Historical population
Year	Pop.	±% p.a.
1968	976	—
1975	1,099	+1.71%
1982	1,020	−1.06%
1990	1,157	+1.59%
1999	1,156	−0.01%
2007	1,242	+0.90%
2012	1,306	+1.01%
2017	1,339	+0.50%
2023	1,330	−0.11%
Source: INSEE

== See also ==
- Communes of the Drôme department
