= Talencieux =

- Commune
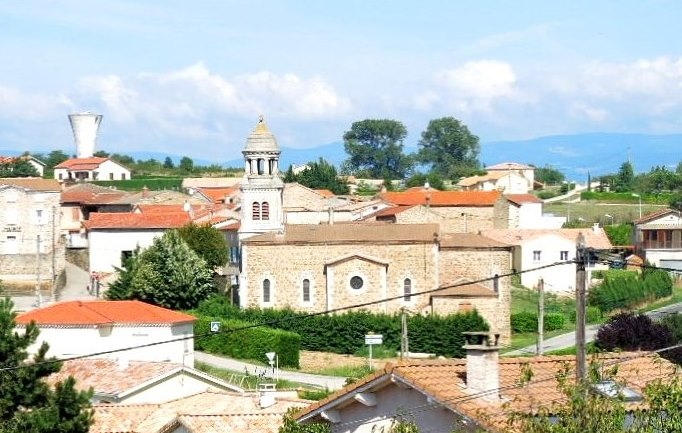
- The church and surrounding buildings in Talencieux
- Location of Talencieux
- Location within France Location within Auvergne-Rhône-Alpes
- Coordinates: 45°13′20″N 4°46′42″E
- Country: France
- Region: Auvergne-Rhône-Alpes
- Department: Ardèche
- Arrondissement: Tournon-sur-Rhône
- Canton: Annonay-2
- Intercommunality: Annonay Rhône Agglo

Government
  - Mayor (2020–2026): Laurent Marce
- Area^{1}: 7.10 km^{2} (2.74 sq mi)
- Highest elevation: 403 m (1,322 ft)
- Lowest elevation: 140 m (460 ft)
- Population (2023): 1,112
  - Density: 157/km^{2} (406/sq mi)
- Time zone: UTC+01:00 (CET)
  - Summer (DST): UTC+02:00 (CEST)
- INSEE/Postal code: 07317 /07340
- ^{1} French Land Register data, which excludes lakes, ponds, glaciers > 1 km^{2} (0.386 sq mi or 247 acres) and river estuaries.

Talencieux (French pronunciation: [talɑ̃sjø]; Occitan: Talencieu) is a commune in the Ardèche department in southern France.

== See also ==
- Communes of the Ardèche department
