= Champagne, Ardèche =

Champagne
- Commune
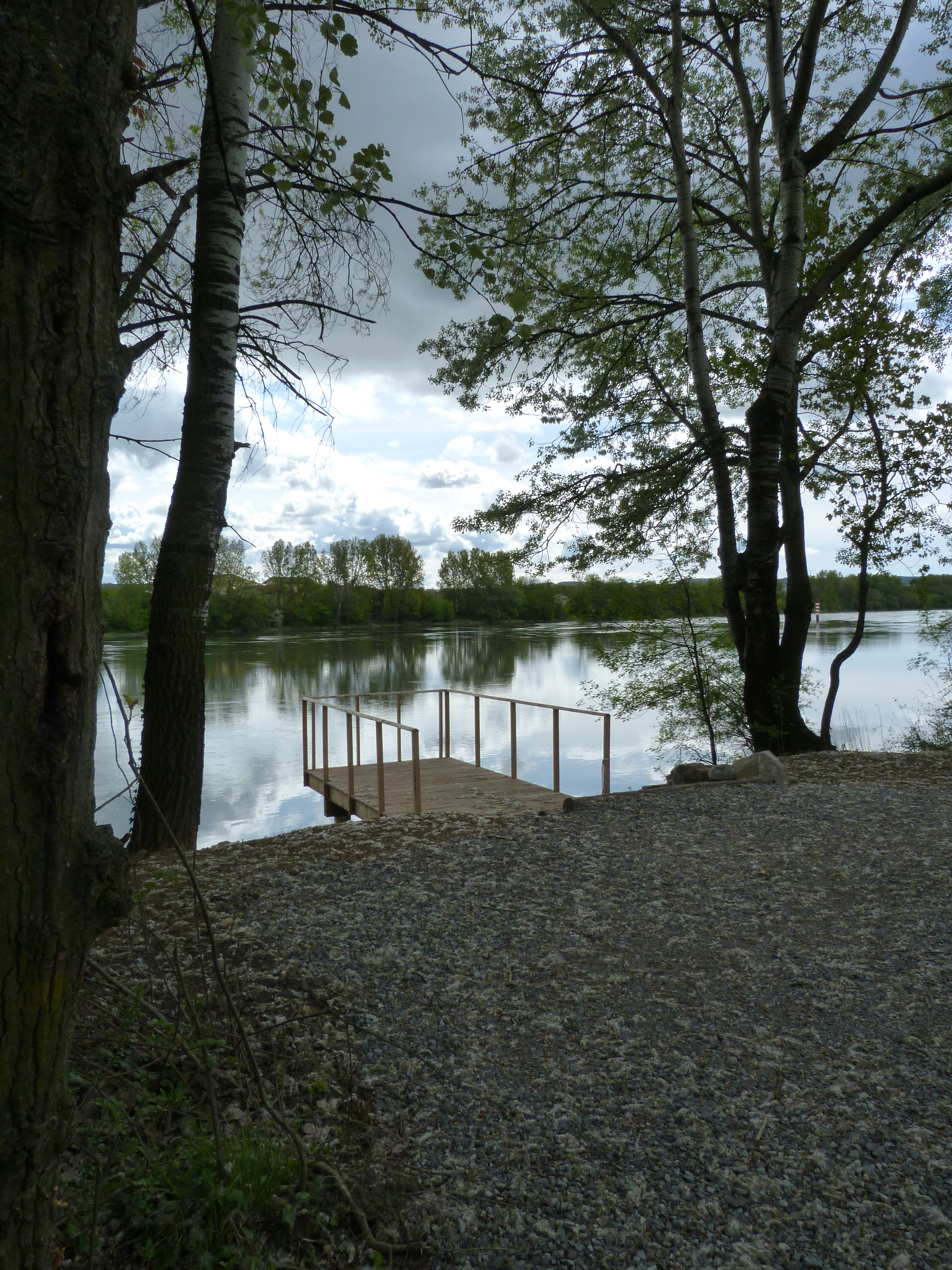
- The Rhône
- Location of Champagne
- Location within France Location within Auvergne-Rhône-Alpes
- Coordinates: 45°16′26″N 4°48′04″E
- Country: France
- Region: Auvergne-Rhône-Alpes
- Department: Ardèche
- Arrondissement: Tournon-sur-Rhône
- Canton: Sarras

Government
  - Mayor (2020–2026): Philippe Delaplacette
- Area^{1}: 4.10 km^{2} (1.58 sq mi)
- Elevation: 145 m (476 ft)
- Highest elevation: 361 m (1,184 ft)
- Lowest elevation: 135 m (443 ft)
- Population (2023): 652
  - Density: 159/km^{2} (412/sq mi)
- Time zone: UTC+01:00 (CET)
  - Summer (DST): UTC+02:00 (CEST)
- INSEE/Postal code: 07051 /07340
- ^{1} French Land Register data, which excludes lakes, ponds, glaciers > 1 km^{2} (0.386 sq mi or 247 acres) and river estuaries.

Champagne (French pronunciation: [ʃɑ̃paɲ]; Arpitan: Champanye; Occitan: Champanha) is a commune in the Ardèche department in southern France.

== Population ==
Historical population
Year	Pop.	±% p.a.
1968	294	—
1975	320	+1.22%
1982	345	+1.08%
1990	406	+2.06%
1999	488	+2.07%
2007	574	+2.05%
2012	617	+1.46%
2017	598	−0.62%
2023	652	+1.45%
Source: INSEE

== See also ==
- Communes of the Ardèche department
