= Sarras, Ardèche =

Sarras
- Commune
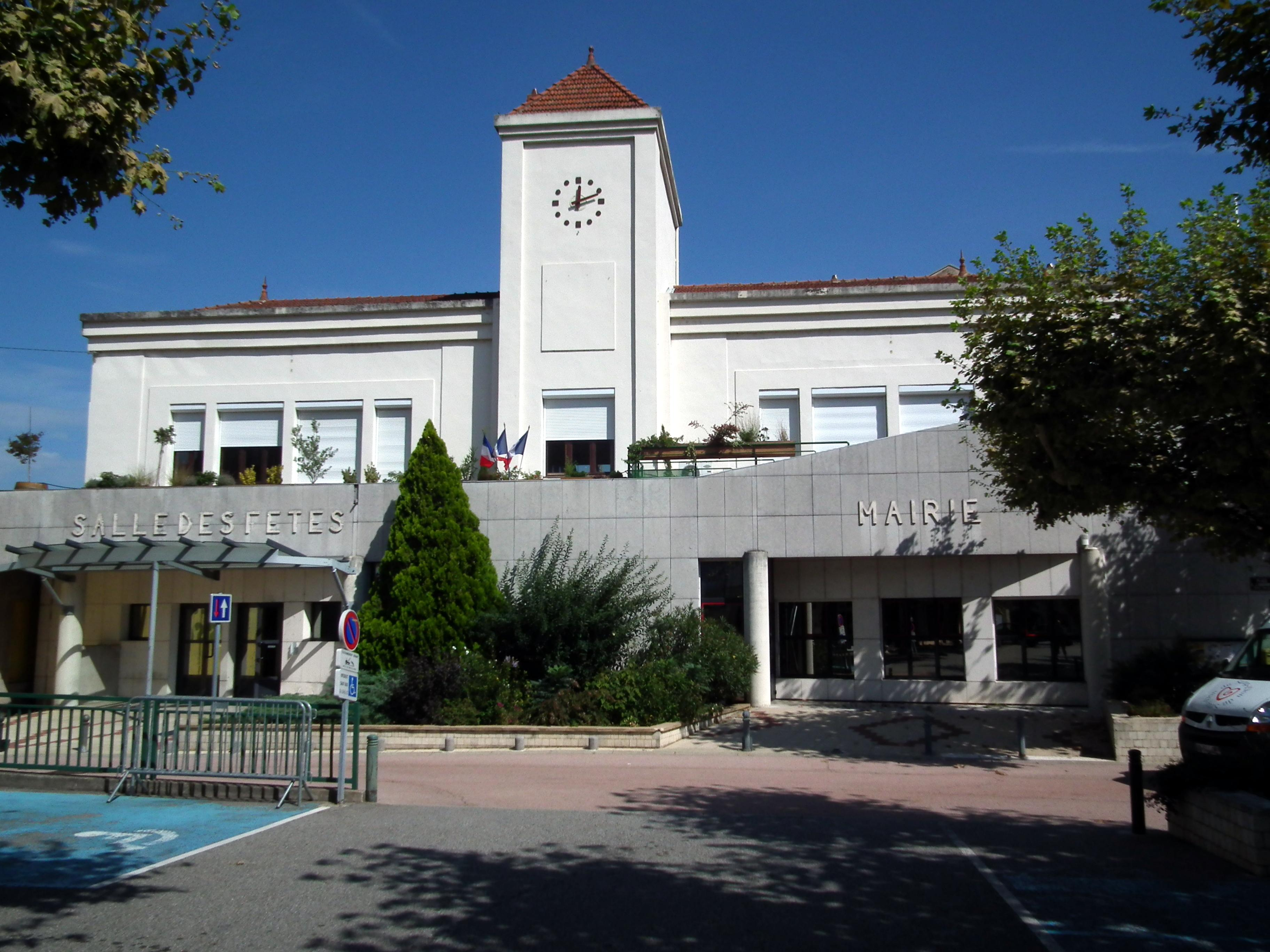
- The town hall in Sarras

- Coat of arms
- Location of Sarras
- Location within France Location within Auvergne-Rhône-Alpes
- Coordinates: 45°11′16″N 4°47′57″E
- Country: France
- Region: Auvergne-Rhône-Alpes
- Department: Ardèche
- Arrondissement: Tournon-sur-Rhône
- Canton: Sarras

Government
  - Mayor (2020–2026): Hélène Oriol
- Area^{1}: 11.65 km^{2} (4.50 sq mi)
- Highest elevation: 402 m (1,319 ft)
- Lowest elevation: 121 m (397 ft)
- Population (2023): 2,220
  - Density: 191/km^{2} (494/sq mi)
- Time zone: UTC+01:00 (CET)
  - Summer (DST): UTC+02:00 (CEST)
- INSEE/Postal code: 07308 /07370
- ^{1} French Land Register data, which excludes lakes, ponds, glaciers > 1 km^{2} (0.386 sq mi or 247 acres) and river estuaries.

Sarras (French pronunciation: [saʁa]; Vivaro-Alpine: Sarràs) is a commune in the Ardèche department in southern France.

== Population ==
Historical population
| Year | Pop. | ±% p.a. |
|---|---|---|
| 1968 | 1,555 | — |
| 1975 | 1,660 | +0.94% |
| 1982 | 1,669 | +0.08% |
| 1990 | 1,837 | +1.21% |
| 1999 | 1,829 | −0.05% |
| 2007 | 2,066 | +1.53% |
| 2012 | 2,072 | +0.06% |
| 2017 | 2,199 | +1.20% |
| 2023 | 2,220 | +0.16% |
Source: INSEE

== Places of interest ==
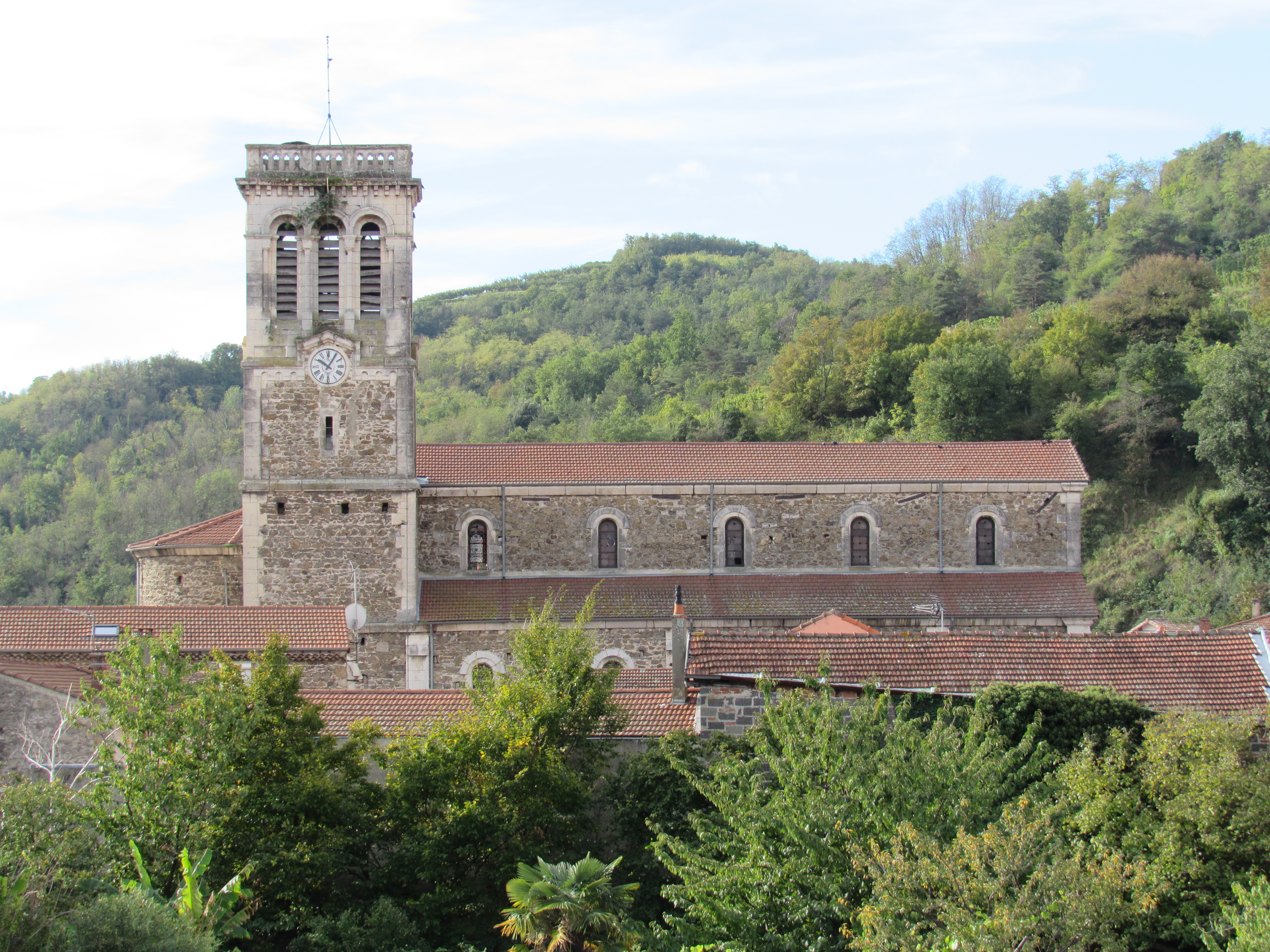
Nativité-de-la-Vierge Church

- Nativité-de-la-Vierge Church, originally built in the 12th century; the present church dates from 1860
- Notre-Dame-d’Espérance Chapel, built in 1874
- Sarras Castle (Revirand, Carret and Sarras castles)
- Fortified gate dating from 1550
- Fountain dating from 1867

== See also ==
- Communes of the Ardèche department
