= Albon-d'Ardèche =

- Commune
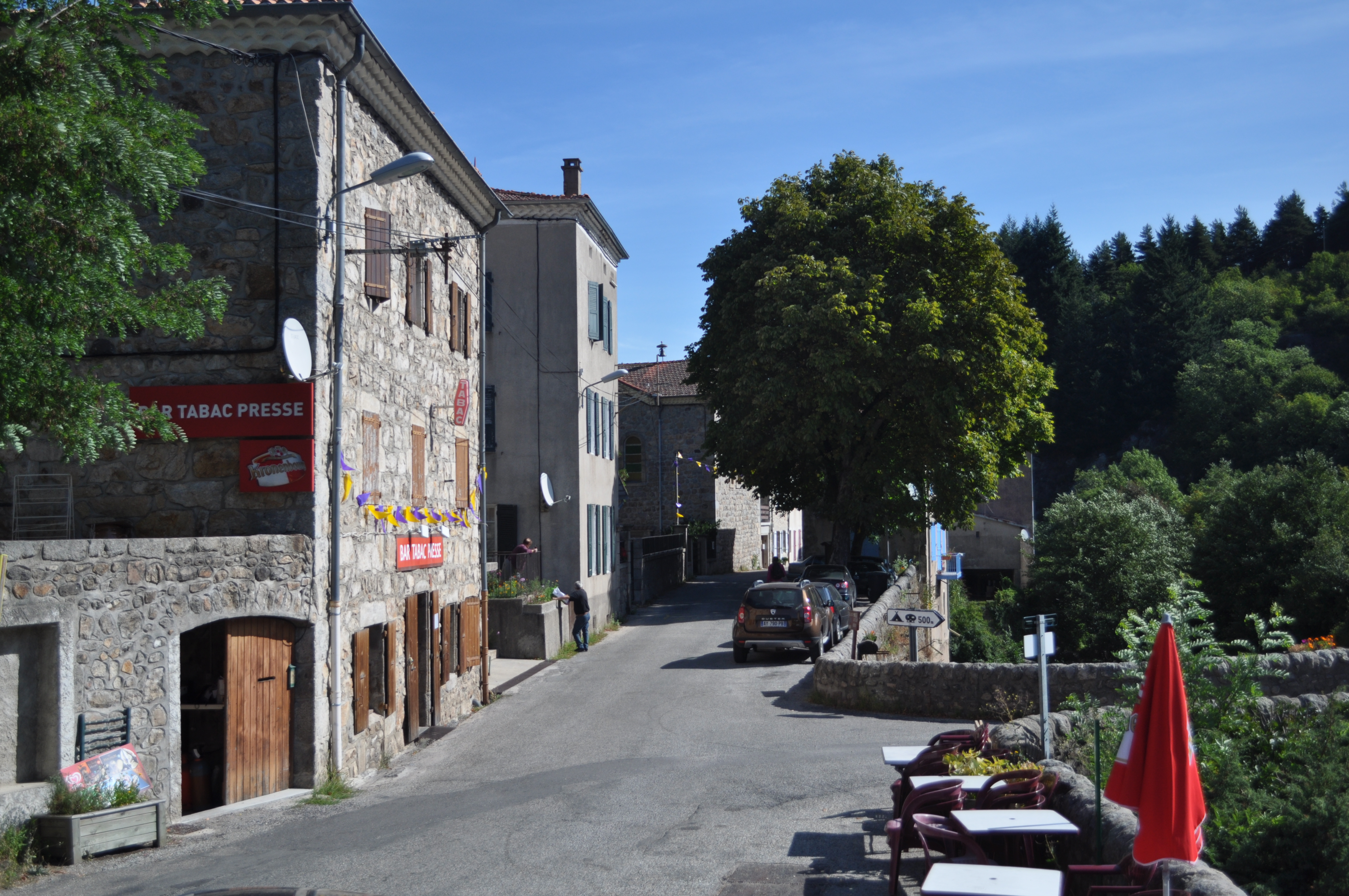
- Albon d'Ardèche main street
- Location of Albon-d'Ardèche
- Location within France Location within Auvergne-Rhône-Alpes
- Coordinates: 44°49′20″N 4°25′43″E
- Country: France
- Region: Auvergne-Rhône-Alpes
- Department: Ardèche
- Arrondissement: Tournon-sur-Rhône
- Canton: Haut-Eyrieux
- Intercommunality: Val'Eyrieux

Government
  - Mayor (2020–2026): Alain Baconnier
- Area^{1}: 9.11 km^{2} (3.52 sq mi)
- Elevation: 630 m (2,070 ft)
- Highest elevation: 1,112 m (3,648 ft)
- Lowest elevation: 567 m (1,860 ft)
- Population (2023): 159
  - Density: 17.5/km^{2} (45.2/sq mi)
- Time zone: UTC+01:00 (CET)
  - Summer (DST): UTC+02:00 (CEST)
- INSEE/Postal code: 07006 /07190
- ^{1} French Land Register data, which excludes lakes, ponds, glaciers > 1 km^{2} (0.386 sq mi or 247 acres) and river estuaries.

Albon-d'Ardèche (French pronunciation: [albɔ̃ daʁdɛʃ]; Occitan: Aubon d'Ardecha) is a commune in the Ardèche department in the Auvergne-Rhône-Alpes region of southern France.

== Geography ==
Albon-d'Ardèche is located some 25 km west of Livron-sur-Drome and about 30 km east of Langogne. The commune is traversed by the D102 coming east from Mézilhac through the village and continuing east to Saint-Sauveur-de-Montagut. The D211 also traverses the commune in the south running east from the D122 to Saint-Pierreville. Grand Feouzet in the south of the commune is accessed from this road via country roads. There is a considerable amount of forest in the commune and a little farming.

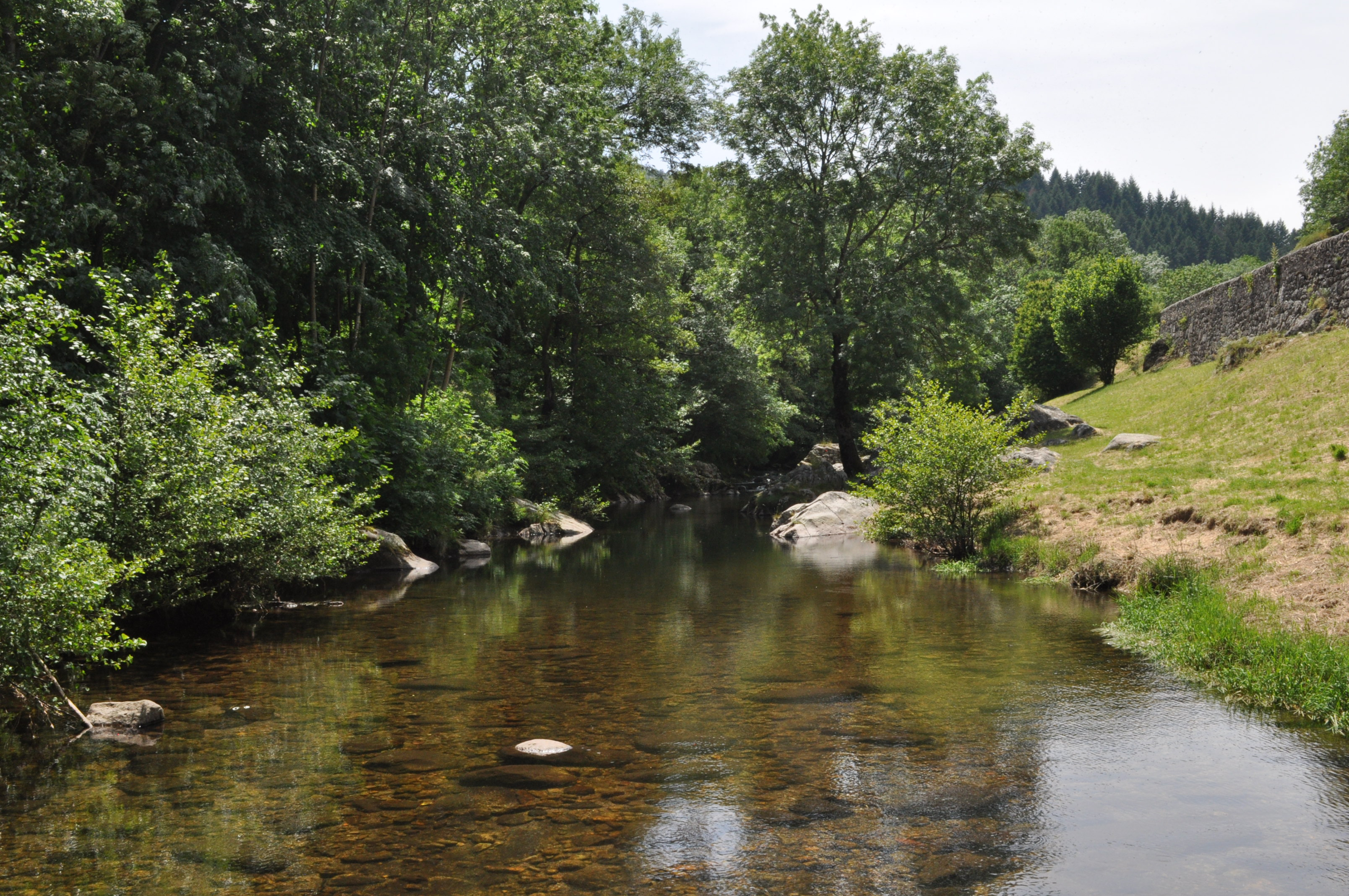
The Glueyre west of the village

The Glueyre river passes through the commune from west to east fed by a number of streams in the commune. The river passes through the village and continues east to join the Eyrieux river at Saint-Sauveur-de-Montagut.

=== Localities, villages and areas ===
- Féouzet (and Grand Féouzet)
- Serrepuy
- La Neuve
- Crouzet
- Ribier
- La Sauzée
- Pouchet
- Rouvier
- Le Priouret
- La Pra
- Rémus
- Le Fay
- La Grangette
- La Combe
- Le Pendey
- Tauzuc

== History ==
The Communes of Albon d'Ardèche and Marcols-les-Eaux formed the village of Marcol until 1912.

== Administration ==
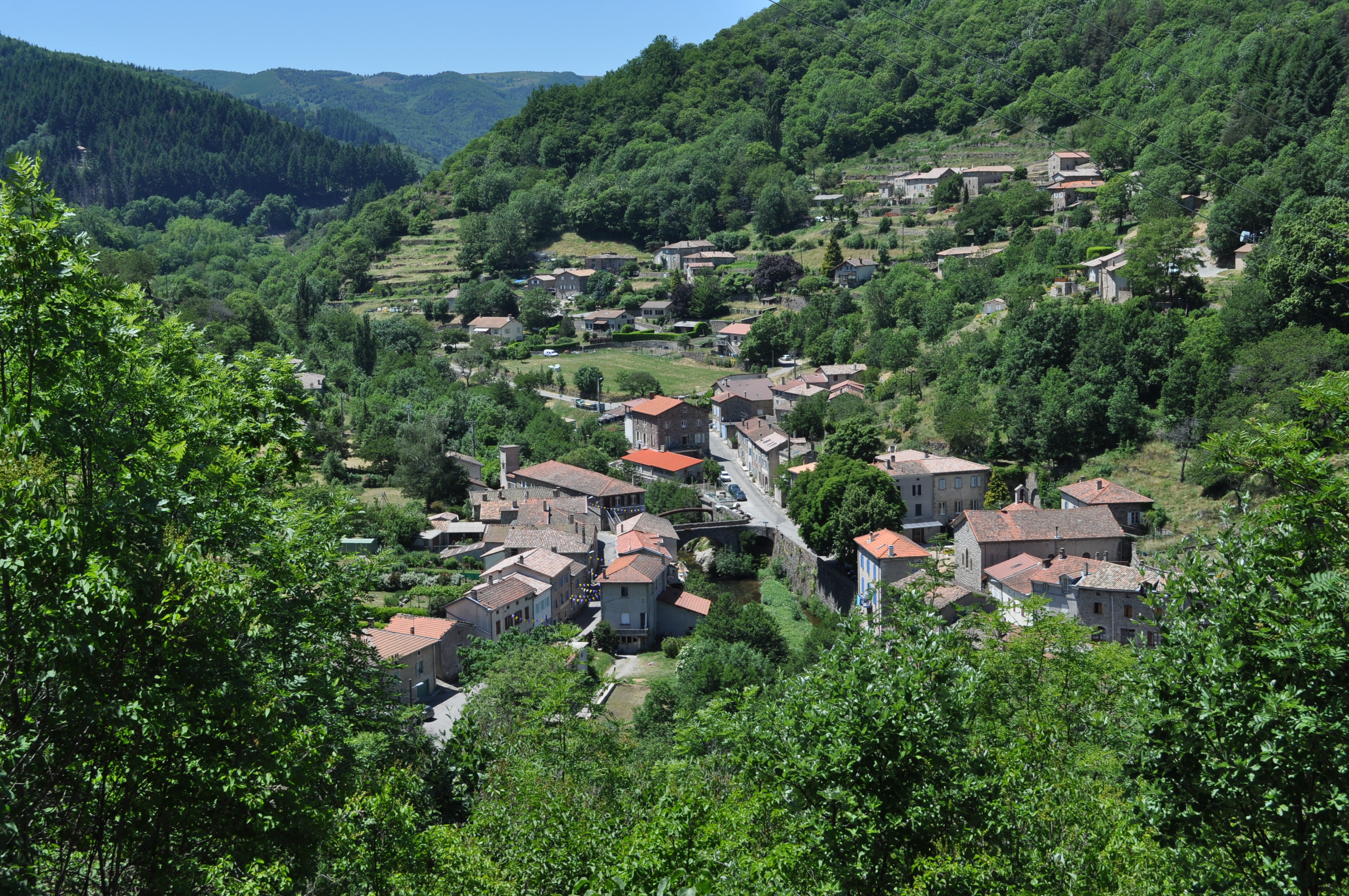
General View of the village

List of Successive Mayors of Albon d'Ardèche

From	To	Name
1912	1919	Auguste Giraud
1919	1923	Elie Seauve
1923	1929	Marcel Magnan
1929	1945	Gaston Bonnet
1945	1953	Elie Berthaud
1953	1958	Gaston Bonnet
1958	1975	Albert Brotte
1975	1983	Fernand Flandrin
1983	1989	Louis Lextrait
1989	1995	Jean Louis Chirouze
1995	1997	Pierre Dumas
1997	2000	René Blache
2000	2001	Gisèle Nury
2001	2010	Michel Filippi
2010	2020	Frédéric Picard
2020	Current	Alain Baconnier

== Population ==
The inhabitants of the commune are known as Albonnais or Albonnaises in French.

Historical population
Year	Pop.	±% p.a.
1968	276	—
1975	232	−2.45%
1982	180	−3.56%
1990	173	−0.49%
1999	165	−0.52%
2007	159	−0.46%
2012	159	+0.00%
2017	159	+0.00%
2023	159	+0.00%
Source: INSEE

== Gallery ==
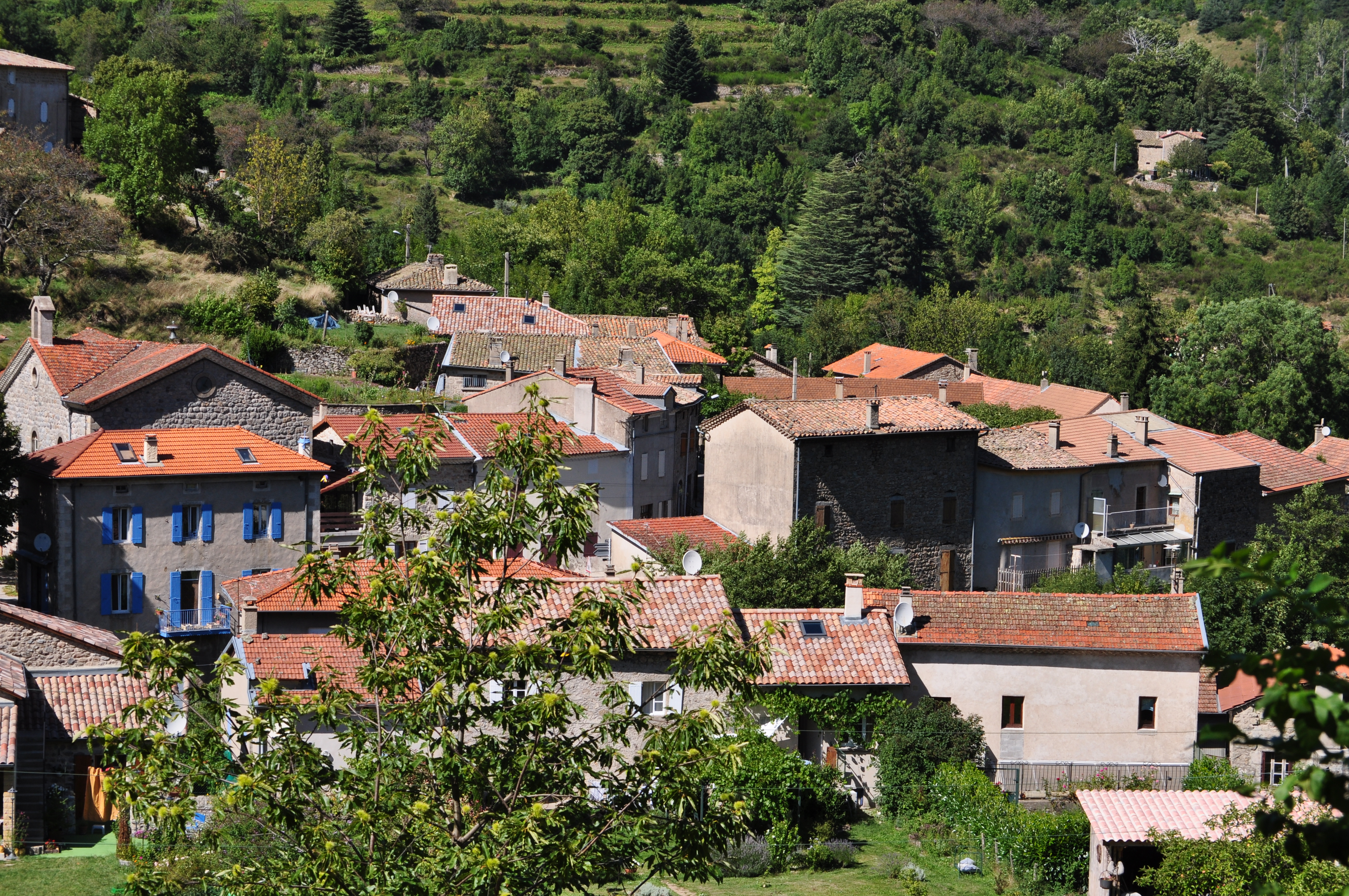
The east of the village

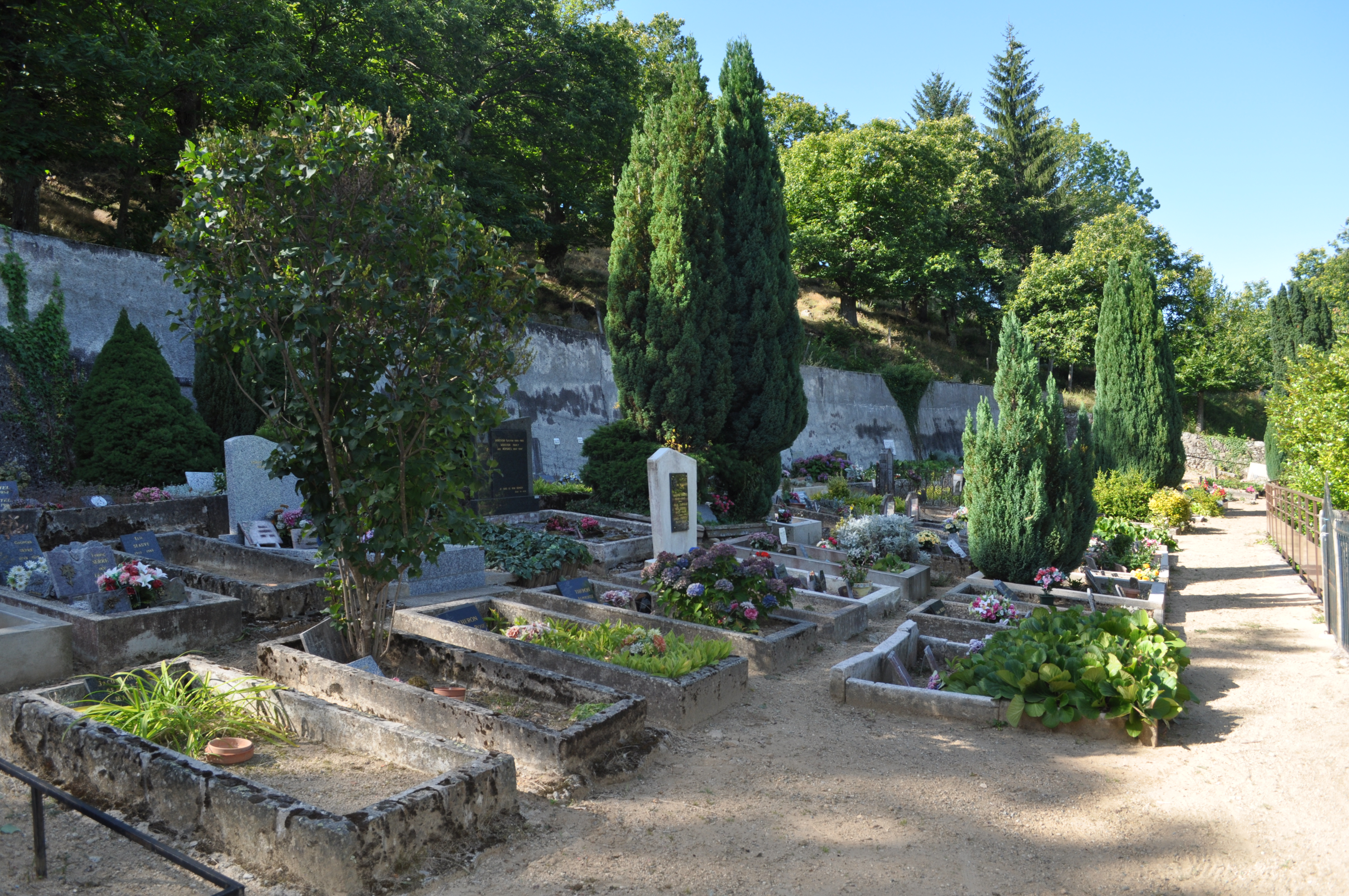
The Municipal Cemetery

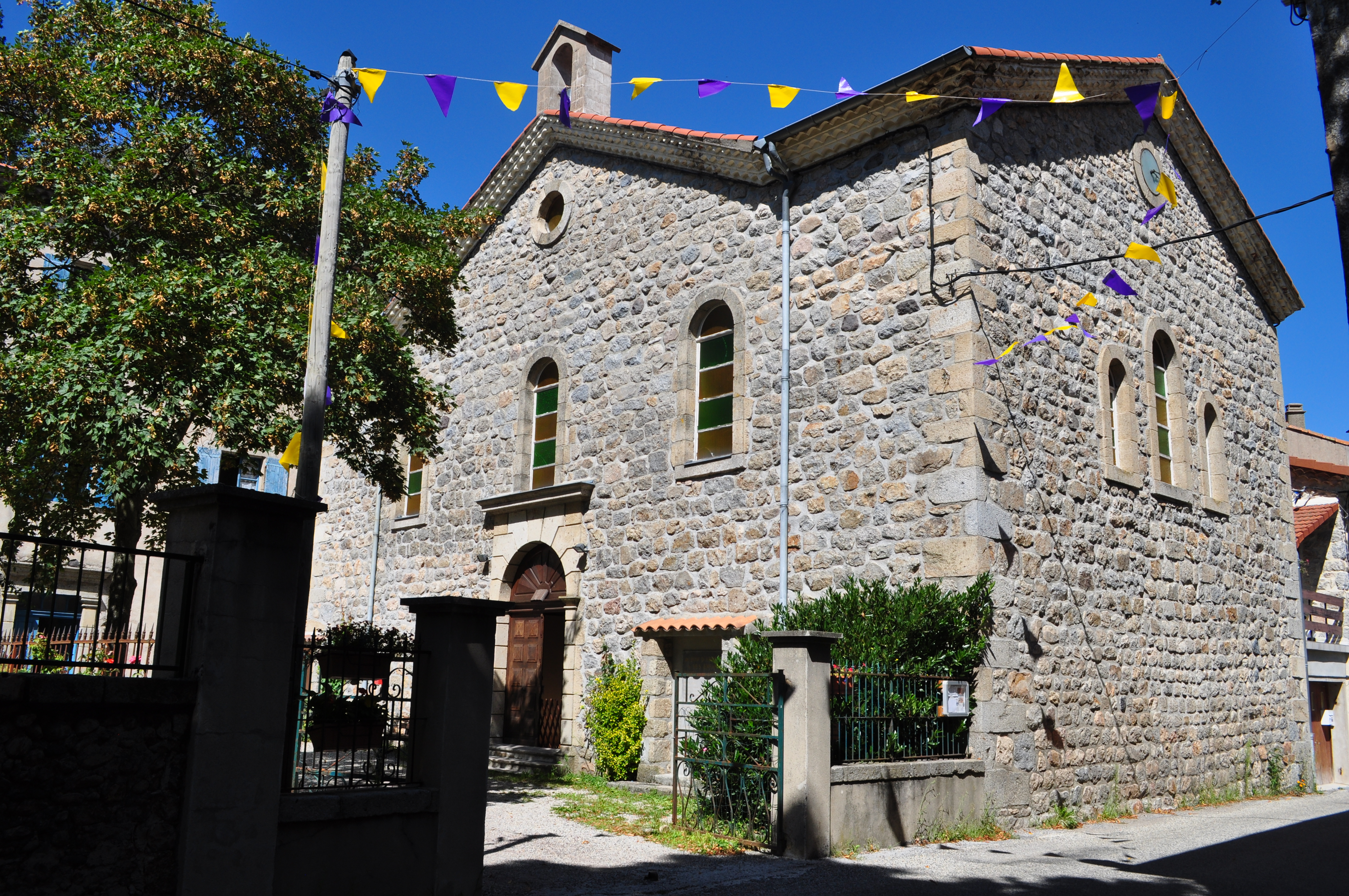
The Temple in the village

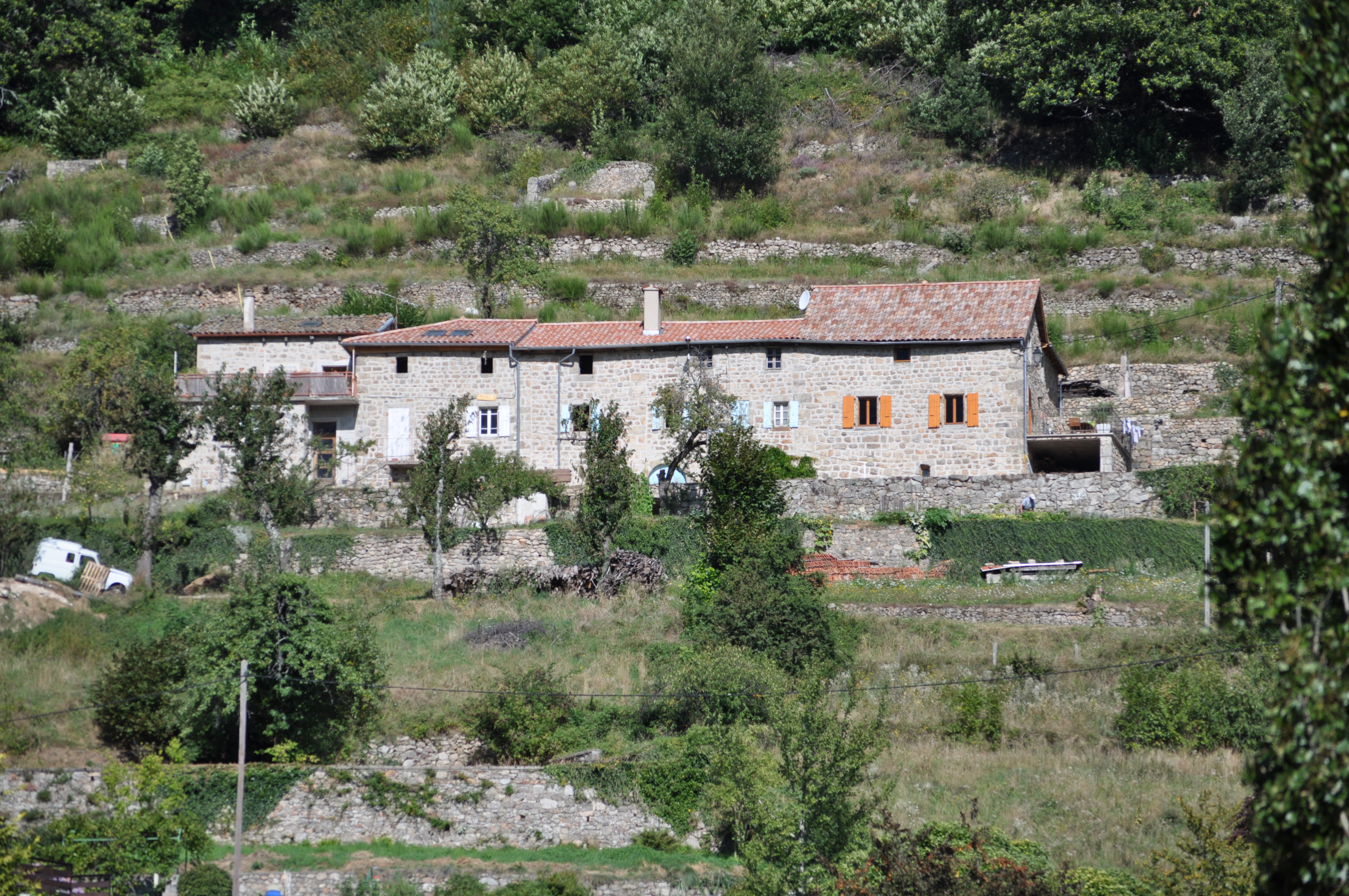
The Garnier Quarter

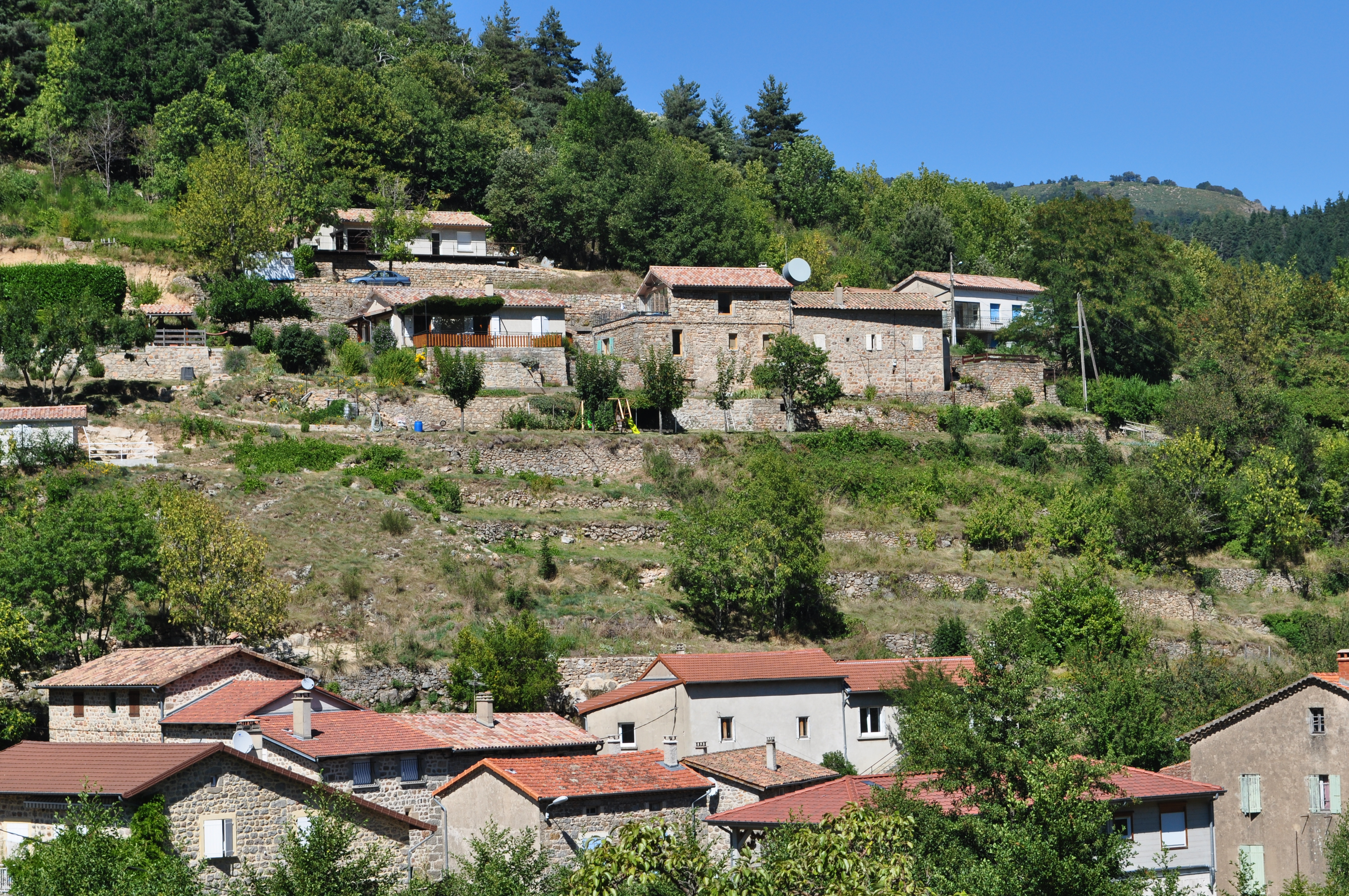
The Périchon Quarter

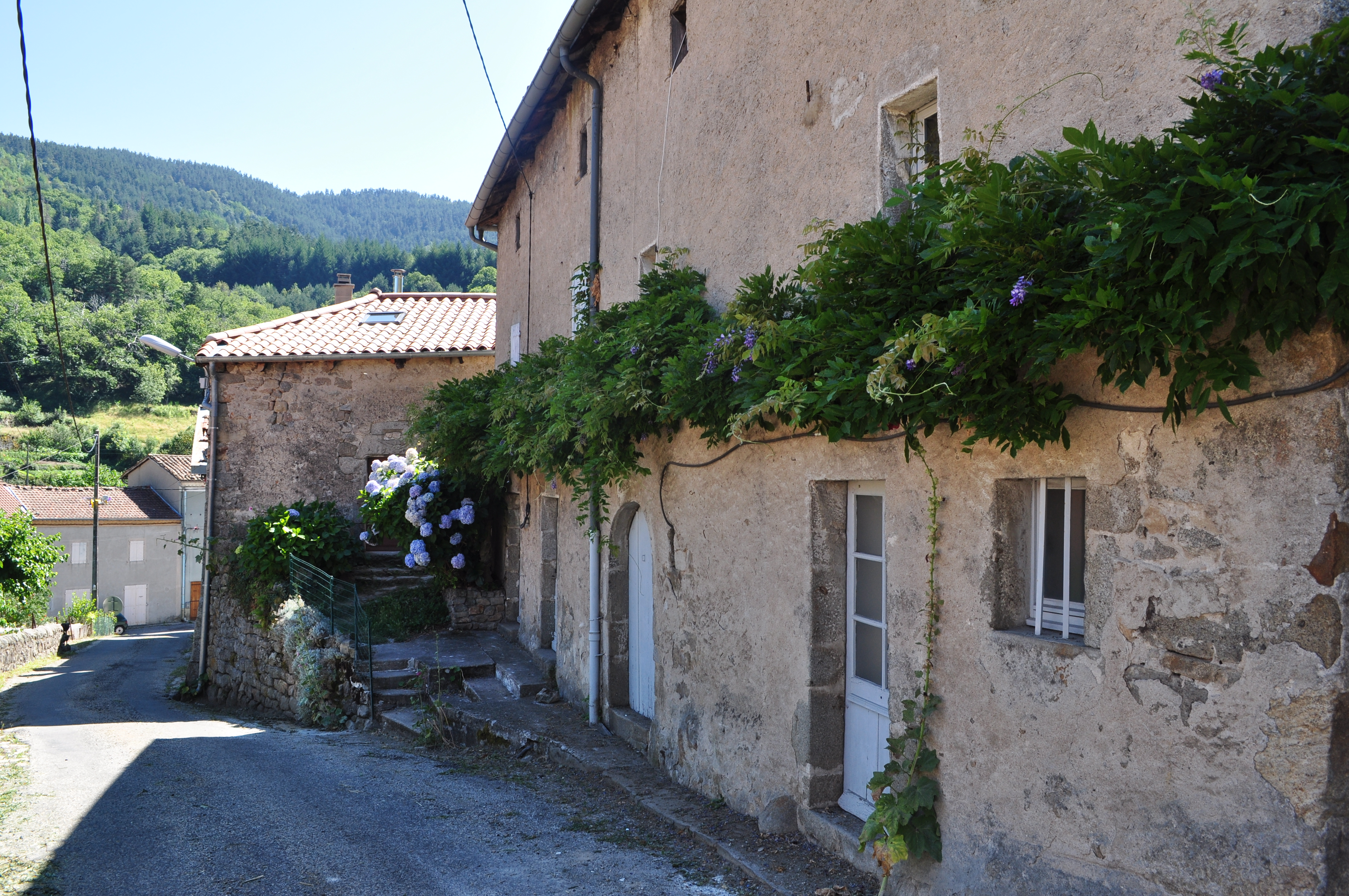
An old house in the village

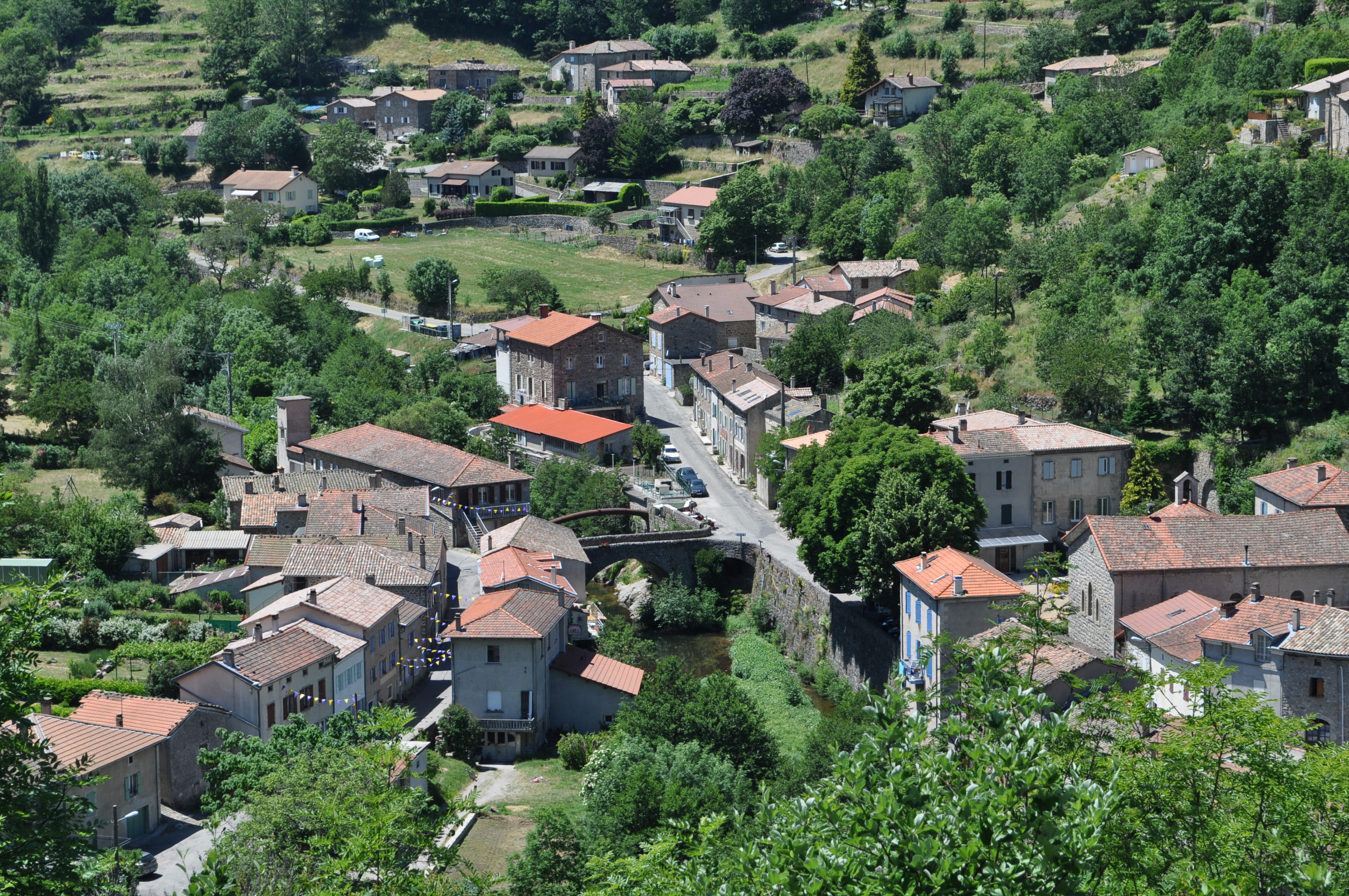
A General View of the village

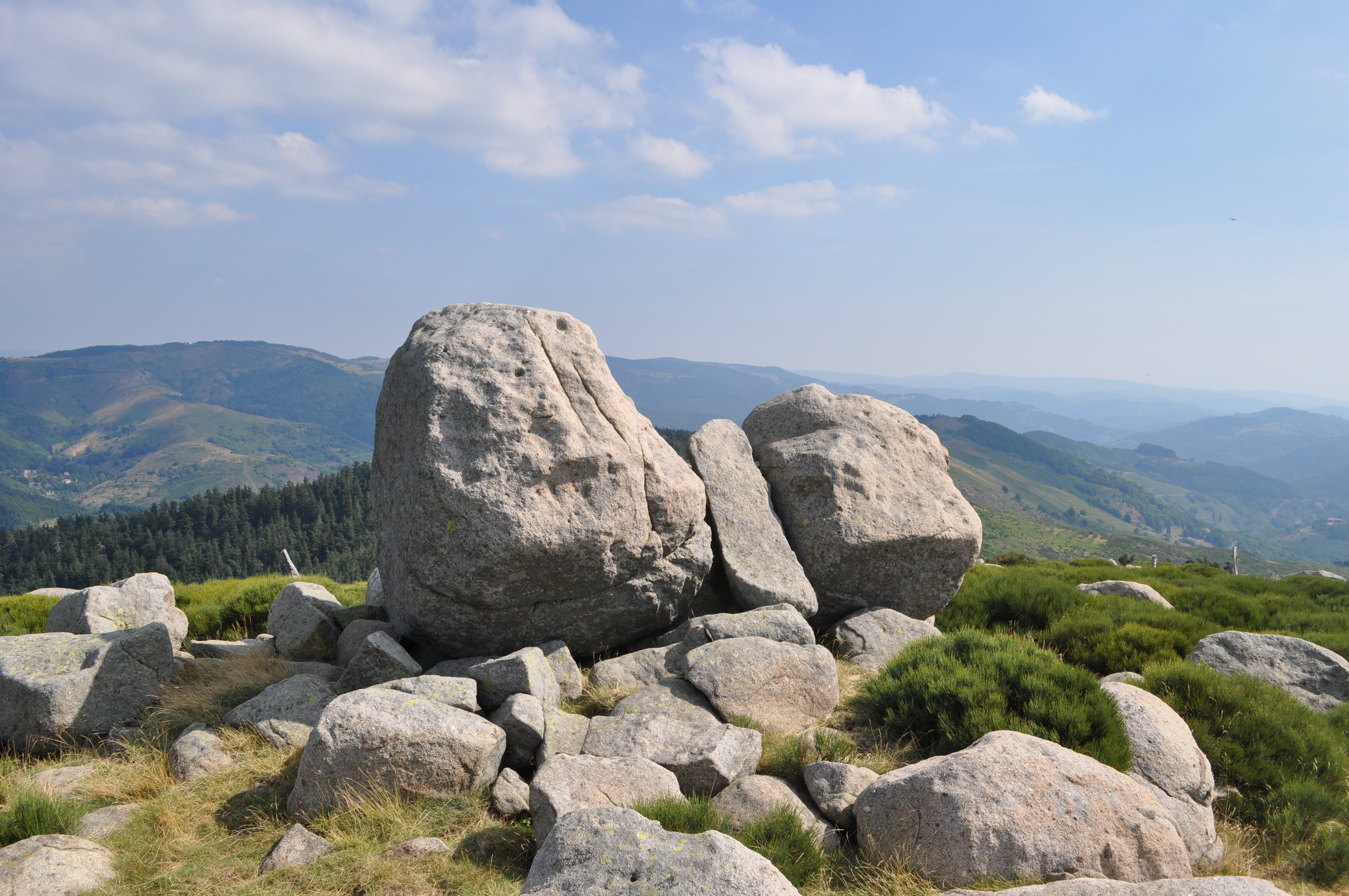
The summit of Serre de Champ Maux

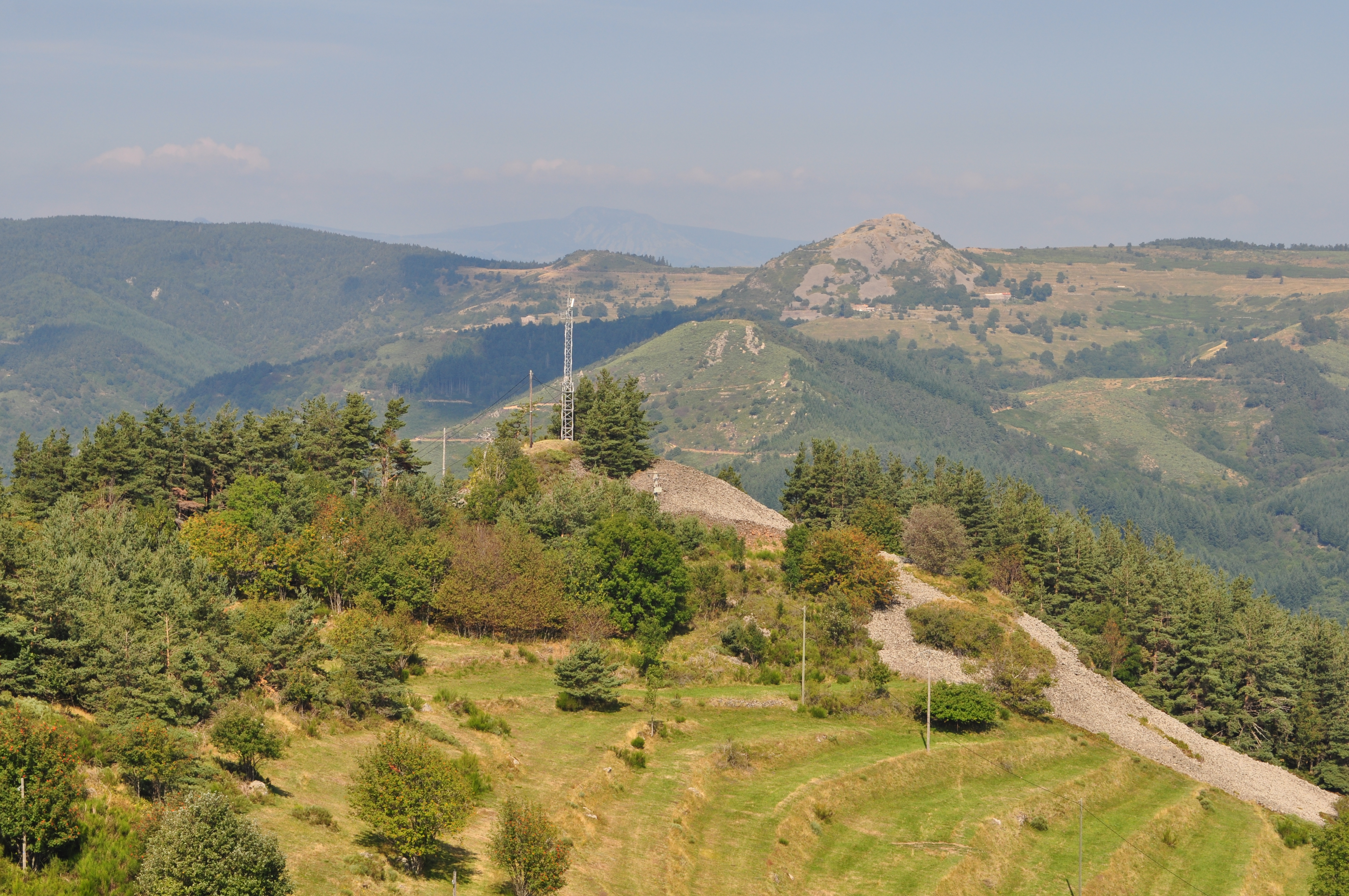
The Graveyre ancient volcano

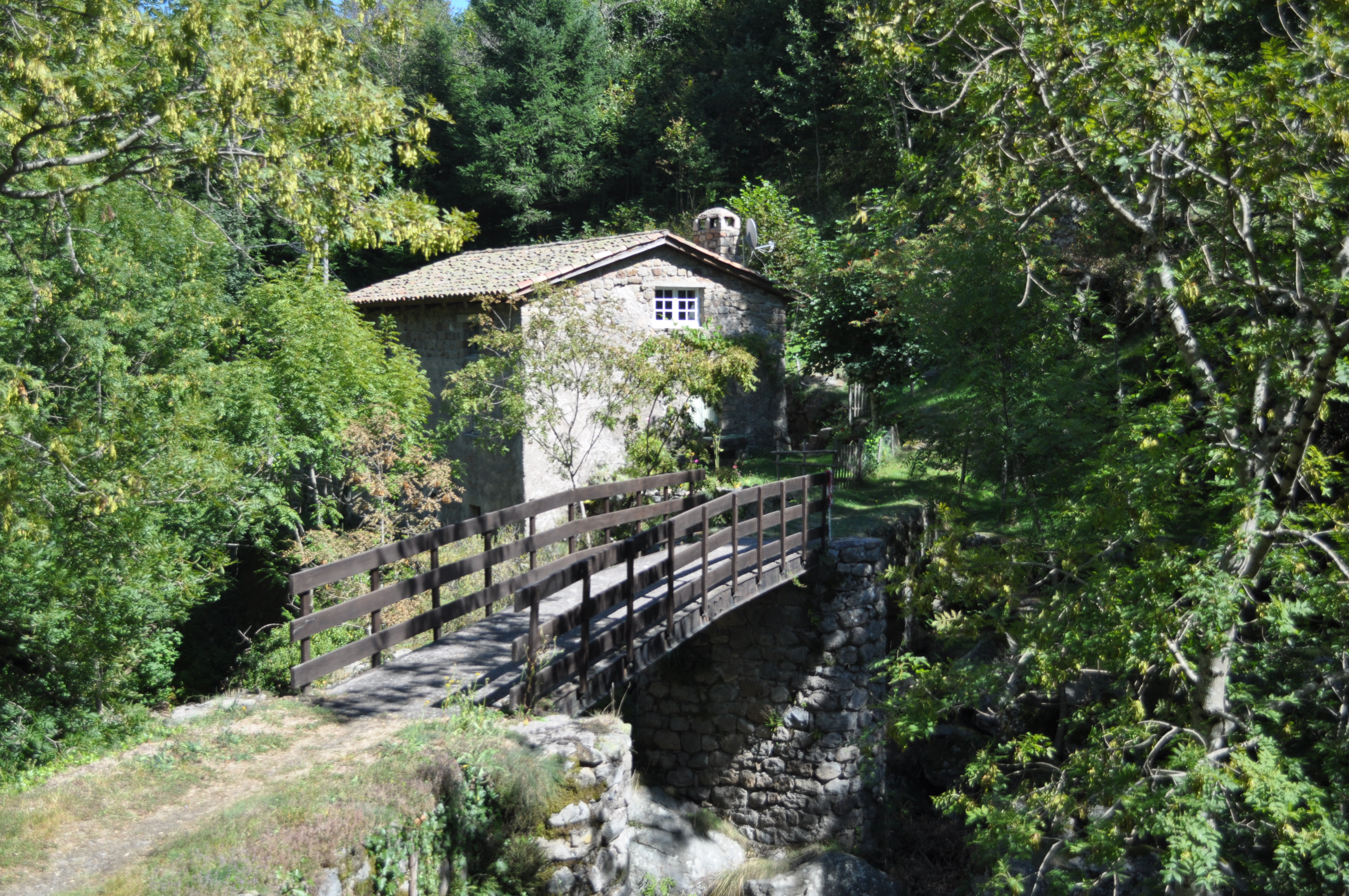
The old Barry Mill

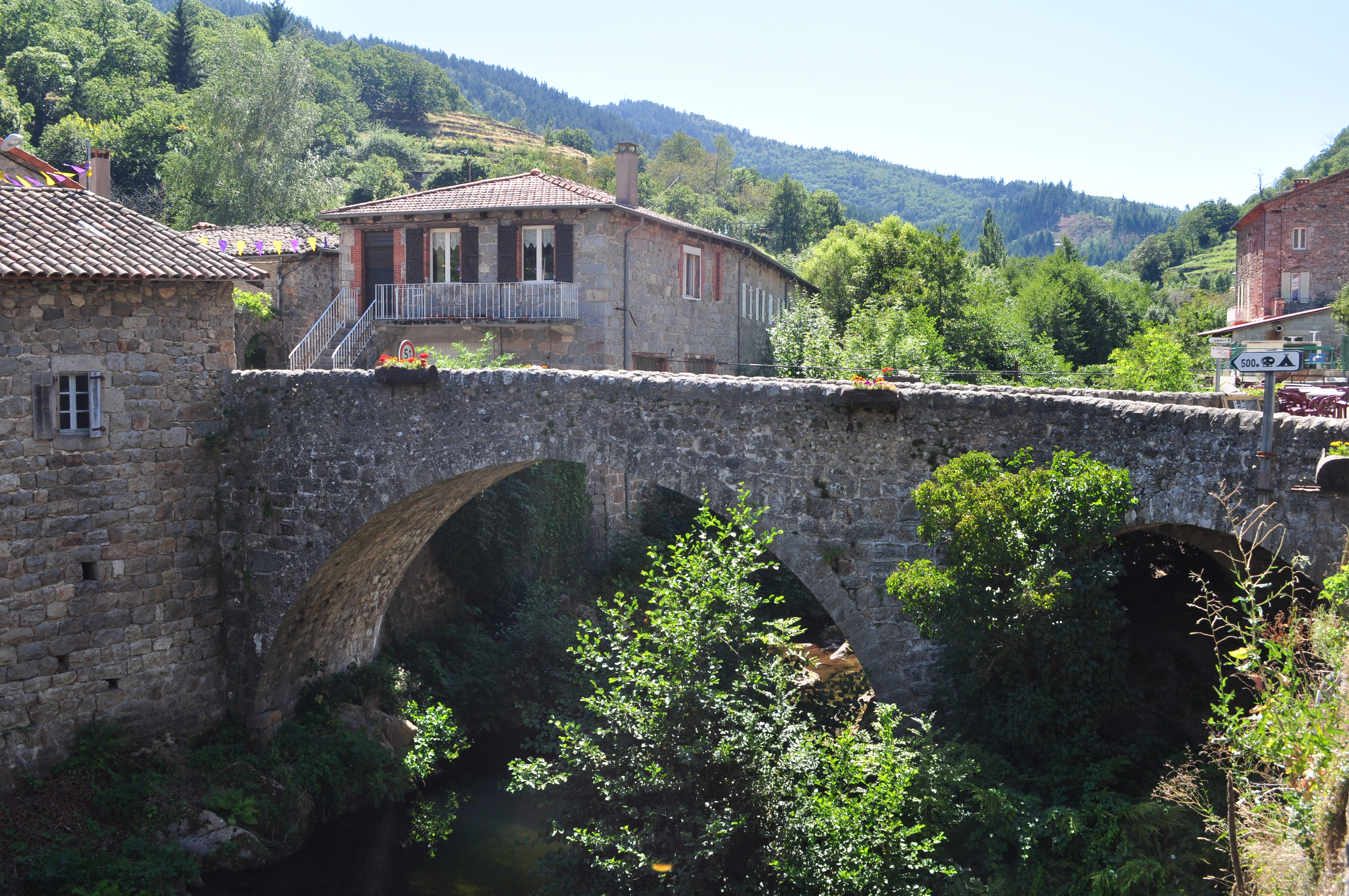
The bridge at Albon d'Ardèche

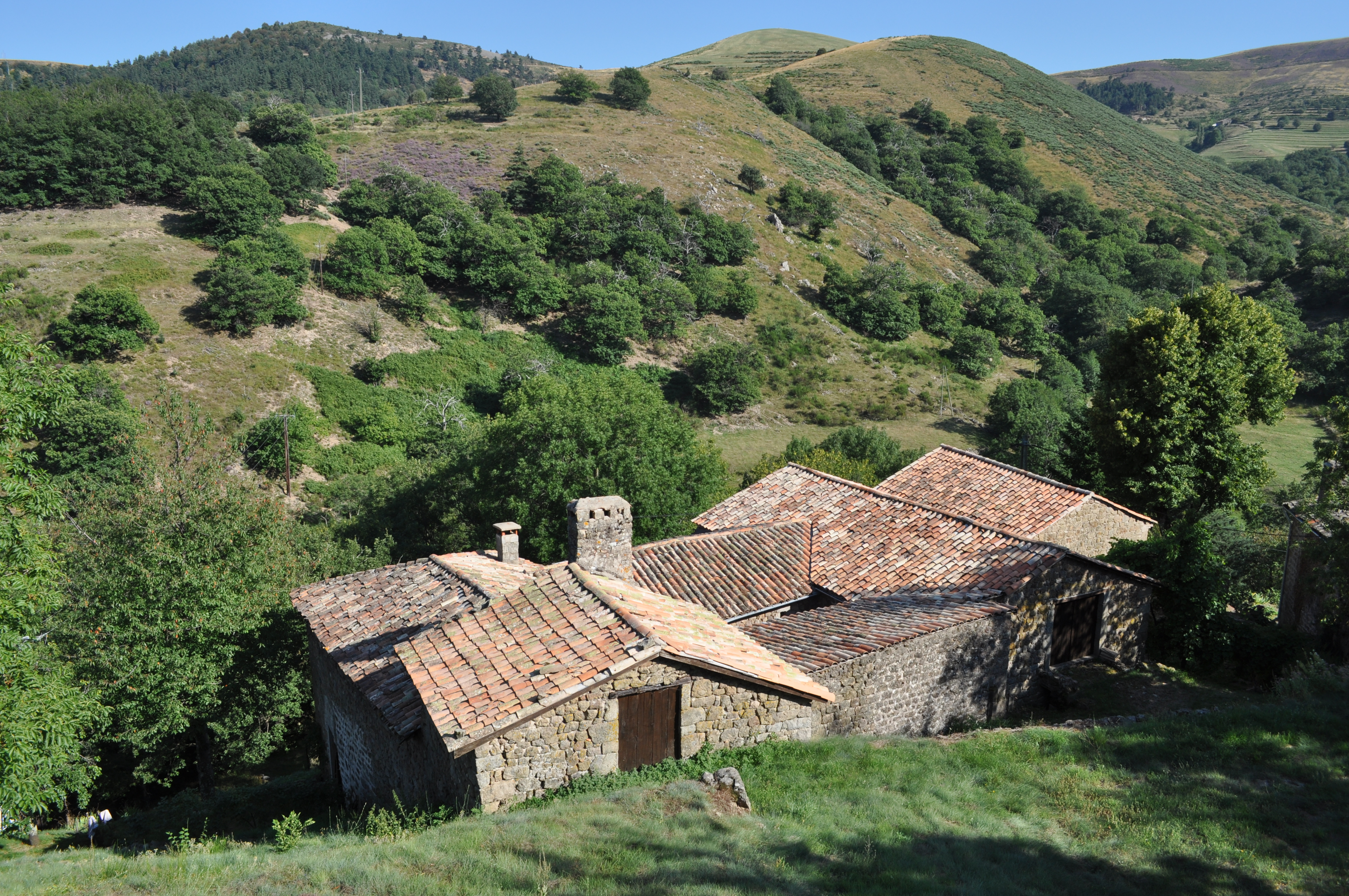
View of Grand Féouzet from the south

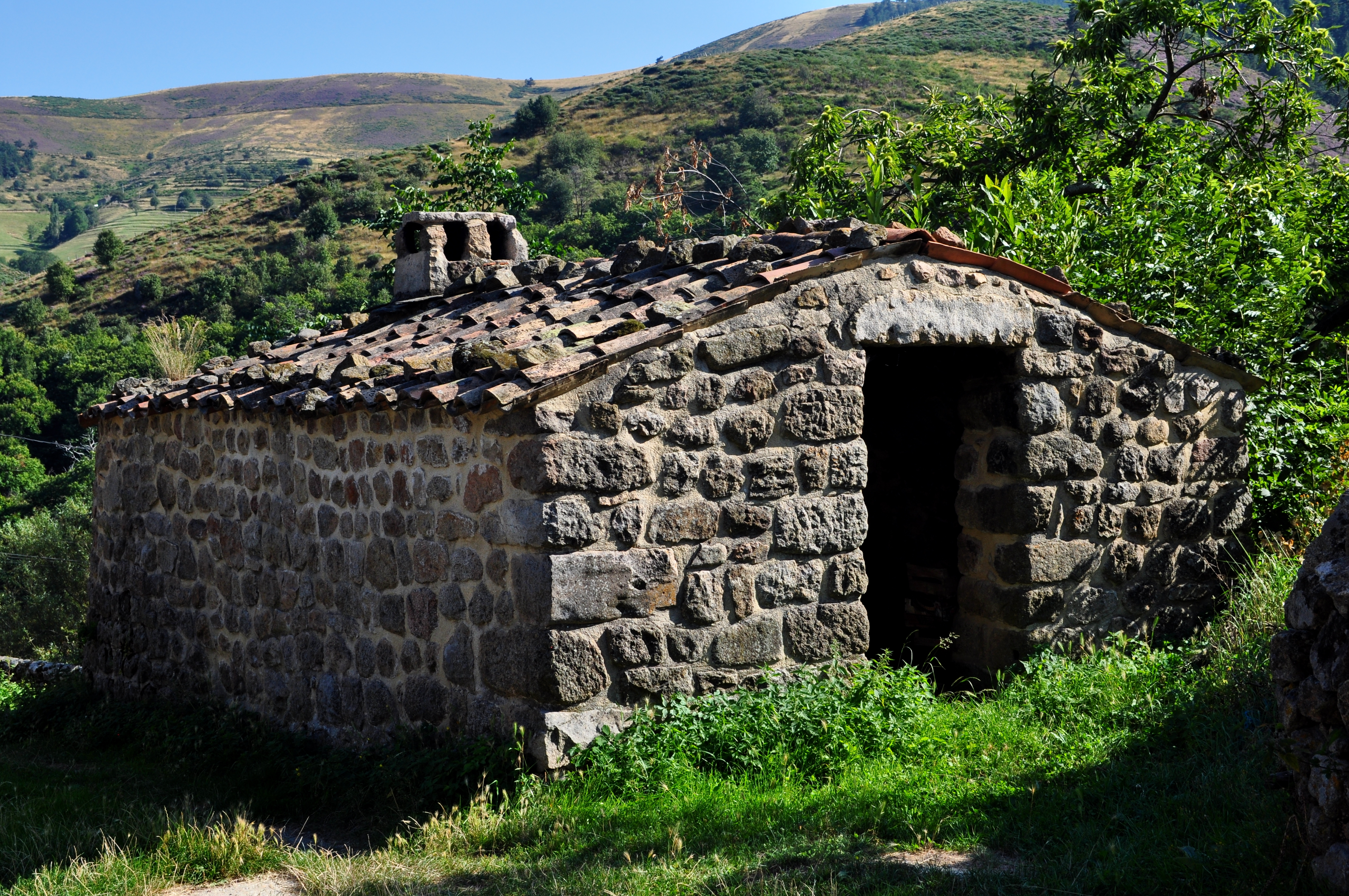
The oven of Féouzet

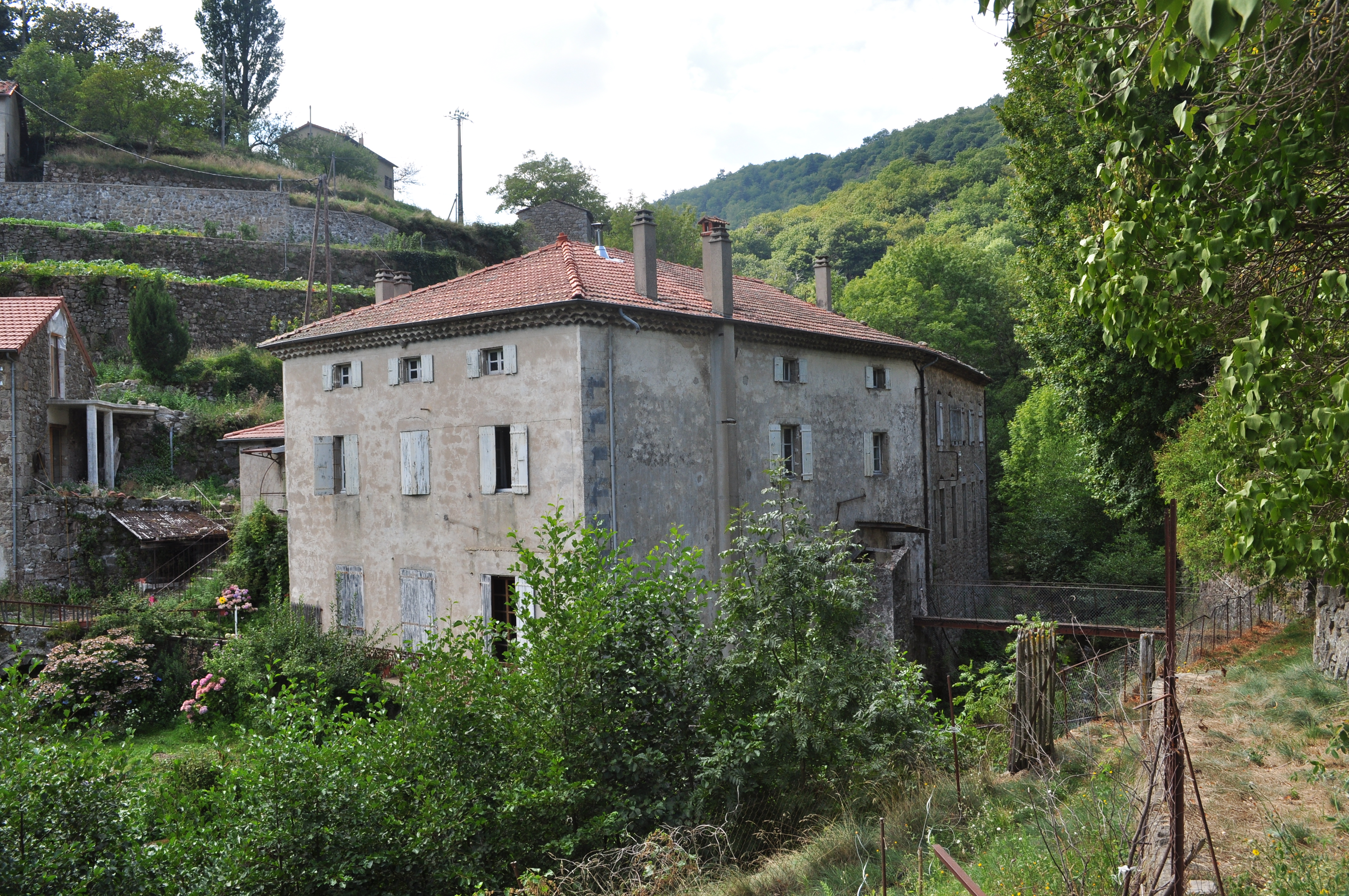
The old grinding mill at La Neuve

== See also ==
- Communes of the Ardèche department
