= Marcols-les-Eaux =

- Commune
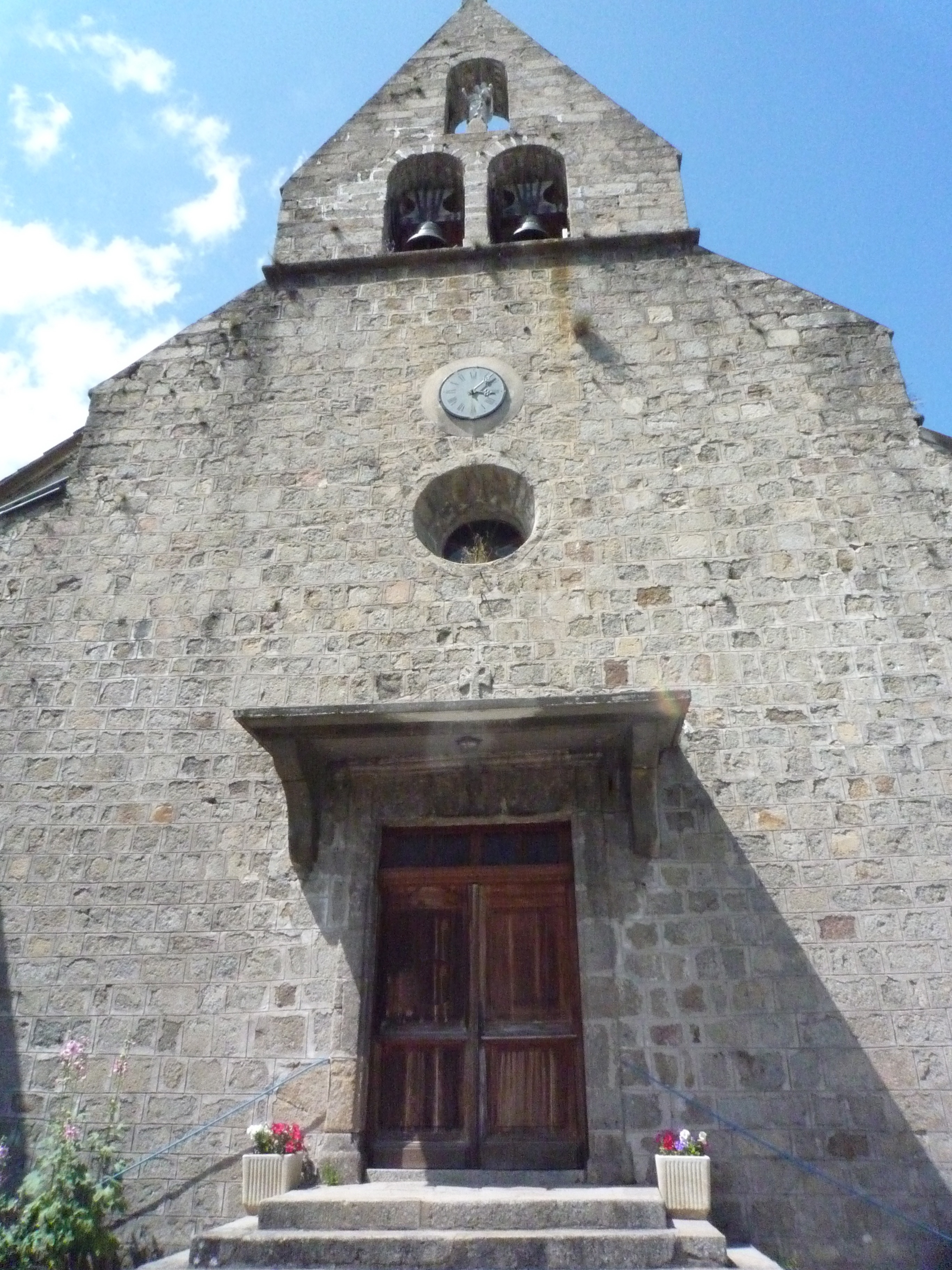
- The church in Marcols-les-Eaux
- Location of Marcols-les-Eaux
- Location within France Location within Auvergne-Rhône-Alpes
- Coordinates: 44°48′57″N 4°24′01″E
- Country: France
- Region: Auvergne-Rhône-Alpes
- Department: Ardèche
- Arrondissement: Privas
- Canton: Haut-Eyrieux
- Intercommunality: CA Privas Centre Ardèche

Government
  - Mayor (2022–2026): François Blache
- Area^{1}: 16 km^{2} (6.2 sq mi)
- Elevation: 729 m (2,392 ft)
- Highest elevation: 1,345 m (4,413 ft)
- Lowest elevation: 671 m (2,201 ft)
- Population (2023): 291
  - Density: 18/km^{2} (47/sq mi)
- Time zone: UTC+01:00 (CET)
  - Summer (DST): UTC+02:00 (CEST)
- INSEE/Postal code: 07149 /07190
- ^{1} French Land Register data, which excludes lakes, ponds, glaciers > 1 km^{2} (0.386 sq mi or 247 acres) and river estuaries.

Marcols-les-Eaux (French pronunciation: [maʁkɔl le.z‿o]; Occitan: Marcols) is a commune in the Ardèche department of southern France.

== History ==
Known as Marcovolos during the 11th century and then Marcouls during the 12th century, the village became Saint-Julien-d'Ursival (first mentioned in 1573), Saint Julian the Hospitaller being the patron of the town. In 1790, the village is renamed Marcols by the revolutionaries willing to remove any references to the Catholic Church. In 1912, the town becomes Marcols-les-Eaux as many mineral water sources are found throughout the village. A source was exploited for bottled mineral water until the late 1950s. In 1912, 36% of the commune's territory are detached to form the new town of Albon-d'Ardèche.

On 4 November 1943, an airplane of the British Royal Air Force, dropping guns and munitions to the local Resistance during the night, crashes against the Bourboulas pike, in Marcols-les-Eaux. 7 of the 8 crew members died. They were buried the next day in the village cemetery by the inhabitants. Their tombstones are still visible.

On 7 August 1944, the German Luftwaffe, suspecting the inhabitants of supplying the local Resistance with food, bombs the village several times during the day killing three local civilians and destroying a couple of farms and houses. A plate commemorating this bloody event was inaugurated along the wall of the commune's cemetery.

== Population ==
Until 1912, the two communes of Marcols-les-Eaux and Albon-d'Ardèche formed a single commune named Marcols.

Historical population
| Year | Pop. | ±% p.a. |
|---|---|---|
| 1968 | 454 | — |
| 1975 | 353 | −3.53% |
| 1982 | 325 | −1.17% |
| 1990 | 300 | −1.00% |
| 1999 | 301 | +0.04% |
| 2007 | 330 | +1.16% |
| 2012 | 319 | −0.68% |
| 2017 | 296 | −1.49% |
| 2023 | 291 | −0.28% |
Source: INSEE

== Gallery ==
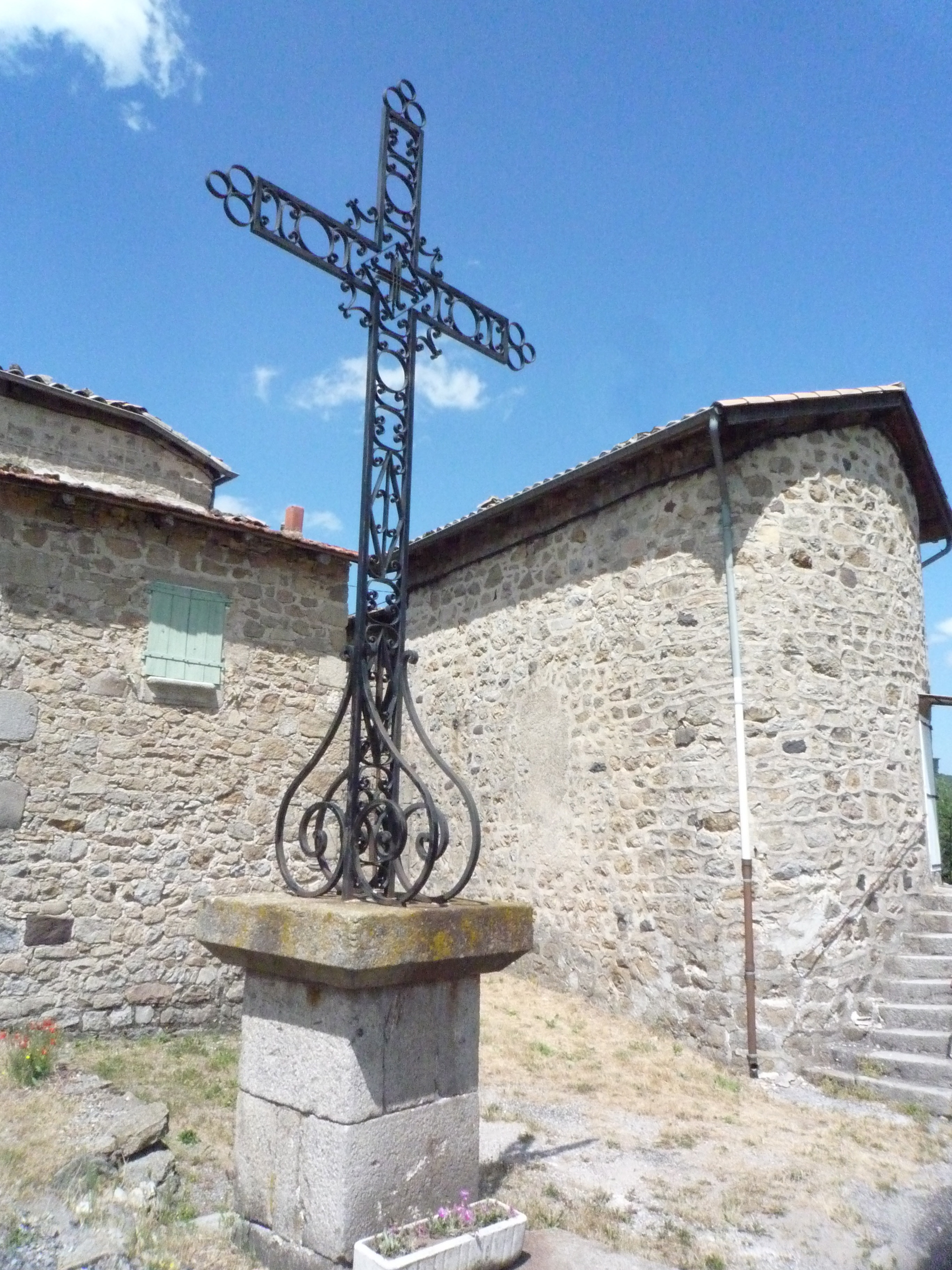
A cross in the village

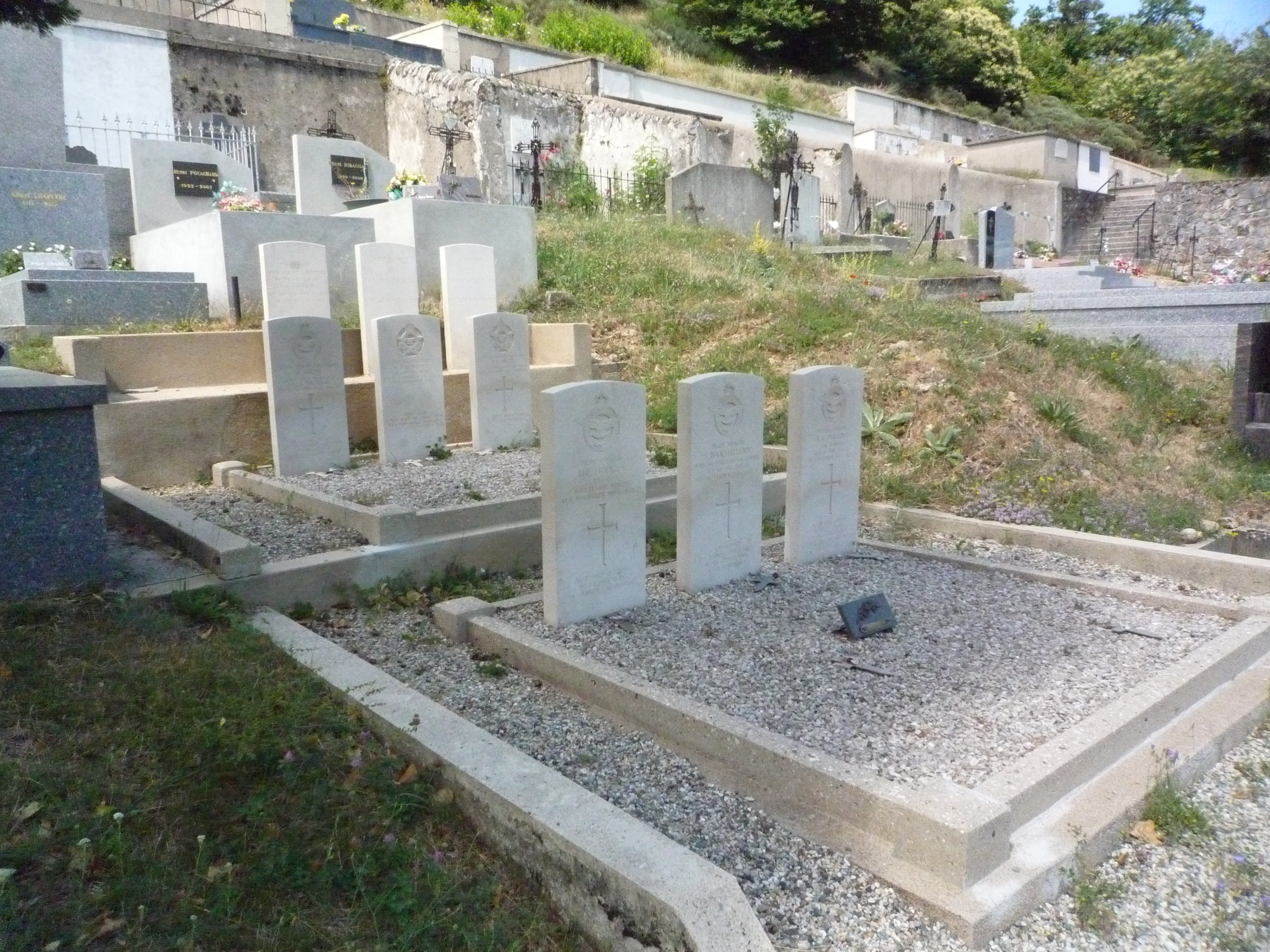
The Royal Air Force's crewmembers' tombstones in the village's cemetery

== See also ==
- Communes of the Ardèche department
