= Saint-Martin-de-Valamas =

- Commune
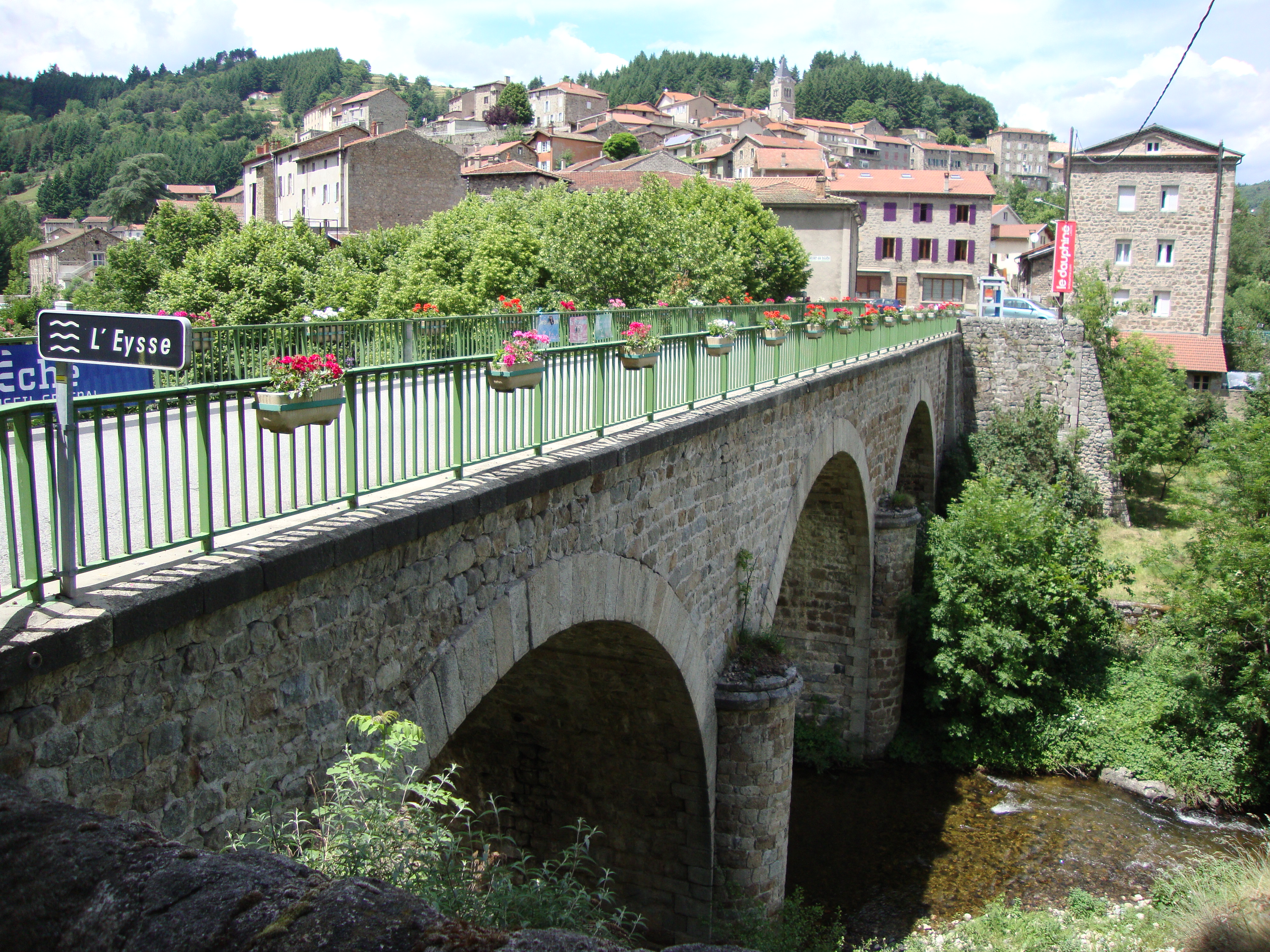
- The bridge over the Eysse, in Saint-Martin-de-Valamas

- Coat of arms
- Location of Saint-Martin-de-Valamas
- Location within France Location within Auvergne-Rhône-Alpes
- Coordinates: 44°56′17″N 4°22′10″E
- Country: France
- Region: Auvergne-Rhône-Alpes
- Department: Ardèche
- Arrondissement: Tournon-sur-Rhône
- Canton: Haut-Eyrieux

Government
  - Mayor (2020–2026): Yves Le Bon
- Area^{1}: 19.98 km^{2} (7.71 sq mi)
- Elevation: 550 m (1,800 ft)
- Highest elevation: 1,050 m (3,440 ft)
- Lowest elevation: 470 m (1,540 ft)
- Population (2023): 1,075
  - Density: 53.80/km^{2} (139.4/sq mi)
- Time zone: UTC+01:00 (CET)
  - Summer (DST): UTC+02:00 (CEST)
- INSEE/Postal code: 07269 /07310
- ^{1} French Land Register data, which excludes lakes, ponds, glaciers > 1 km^{2} (0.386 sq mi or 247 acres) and river estuaries.

Saint-Martin-de-Valamas (Occitan: Sant Martin de Valamàs) is a commune in the Ardèche department in southern France.

== Population ==
Historical population
Year	Pop.	±% p.a.
1968	1,625	—
1975	1,640	+0.13%
1982	1,516	−1.12%
1990	1,386	−1.11%
1999	1,299	−0.72%
2007	1,281	−0.17%
2012	1,202	−1.27%
2017	1,115	−1.49%
2023	1,075	−0.61%
Source: INSEE

== See also ==
- Communes of the Ardèche department
