= Septentrional =

Latinate adjective meaning "northern"

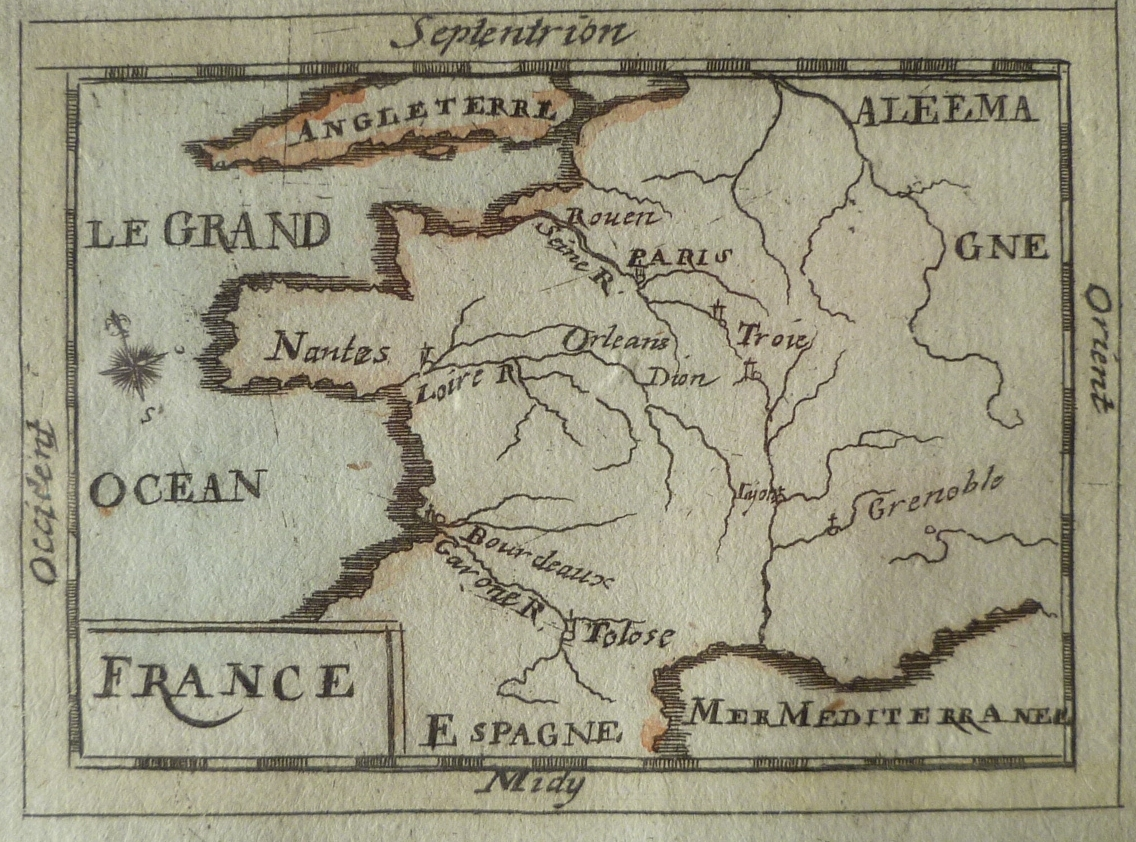
A 17th-century map of France (1687), by Alain Manesson-Mallet, shows the Septentrion atop of the chart, indicating the northern region of the country; the other regions indicated are the Occident (west), the Orient (east), and the Midy (meridion).

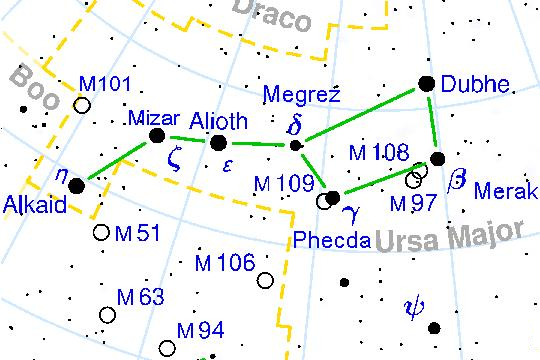
The asterism of the Plough or Wain (Wagon) (US English colloquial name:Big Dipper) (shown in this star map in green) lies within the constellation of Ursa Major.

Septentrional, meaning "of the north", is a Latinate adjective sometimes used in English. It is a form of the Latin noun septentriones, which refers to the seven stars of The Plough (US colloquial name: Big Dipper), occasionally called the Septentrion.

In the 18th century, septentrional languages was a recognised term for the Germanic languages.

== Etymology and background ==
The Oxford English Dictionary gives the etymology of septentrional as:

[ad. L. septentrio, sing. of septentriōnēs, orig. septem triōnēs, the seven stars of the constellation of the Great Bear, f. septem seven + triōnes, pl. of trio plough-ox. Cf. F. septentrion.]

"Septentrional" is more or less synonymous with the term "boreal", derived from Boreas, a Greek god of the North Wind. The constellation Ursa Major, containing the Plough or Wain (Wagon) (US colloquial name: Big Dipper), dominates the skies of the North. The usual antonym for septentrional is the term meridional, which refers to the midday sun.

== Usage ==
Map of the "Septentrional Hemisphere"

The term septentrional is found on maps, mostly those made before 1700. Early maps of North America often refer to the northern- and northwesternmost unexplored areas of the continent as at the "Septentrional" and as "America Septentrionalis", sometimes with slightly varying spellings. (Note: For example, the "Double Hemisphere" world map, by Moses Pitt, dated about 1680, labels North America as America Septentriona, to identify the uncharted, northwest of North America.) Sometimes abbreviated to "Sep.", it was used in historical astronomy to indicate the northern direction on the celestial globe, together with Meridional ("Mer.") for southern, Oriental ("Ori.") for eastern and Occidental ("Occ.") for western.

The linguistic usage in the 17th and 18th centuries was as an umbrella term. It described "the Germanic languages, usually with particular emphasis on Anglo-Saxon, Old Norse and Gothic." Writing of Johann Georg Keyßler in 1758, Thomas Gray distinguished between "Celtic" and "septentrional" antiquities. Thomas Percy actively criticised the blurring of the Celtic and the Germanic in the name of the "septentrional", while at the same time Ossianism favoured it. James Ingram in his inaugural lecture of 1807 called George Hickes "the first of septentrional scholars" for his pioneering lexicographical work on Anglo-Saxon. In current usage, "septentrional fiction" may refer to a setting in the Canadian North.

In France, the term septentrional refers to the Northern stretch of the Côtes du Rhône AOC winemaking region. The Northern Rhône, or septentrional, runs along the Rhône river from Vienne in the north, to Montélimar in the south. It includes the eight crus: Côte Rôtie, Condrieu, Château-Grillet, Hermitage, Saint-Joseph, Crozes-Hermitage, Cornas and Saint-Péray. The Southern Rhône is referred to as the meridional (Rhône méridionale), and extends from Montélimar in the north, to Avignon in the south.

Planisphere of the Septentrional Heavens, c. 1720

== See also ==
- Septentrionalist
- Oriental
- Occidental
- Boreal
- Austral
- Myotis septentrionalis, the Northern Long-eared Bat
- Asplenium septentrionale, the Forked Spleenwort
