= Guigal =

French winery

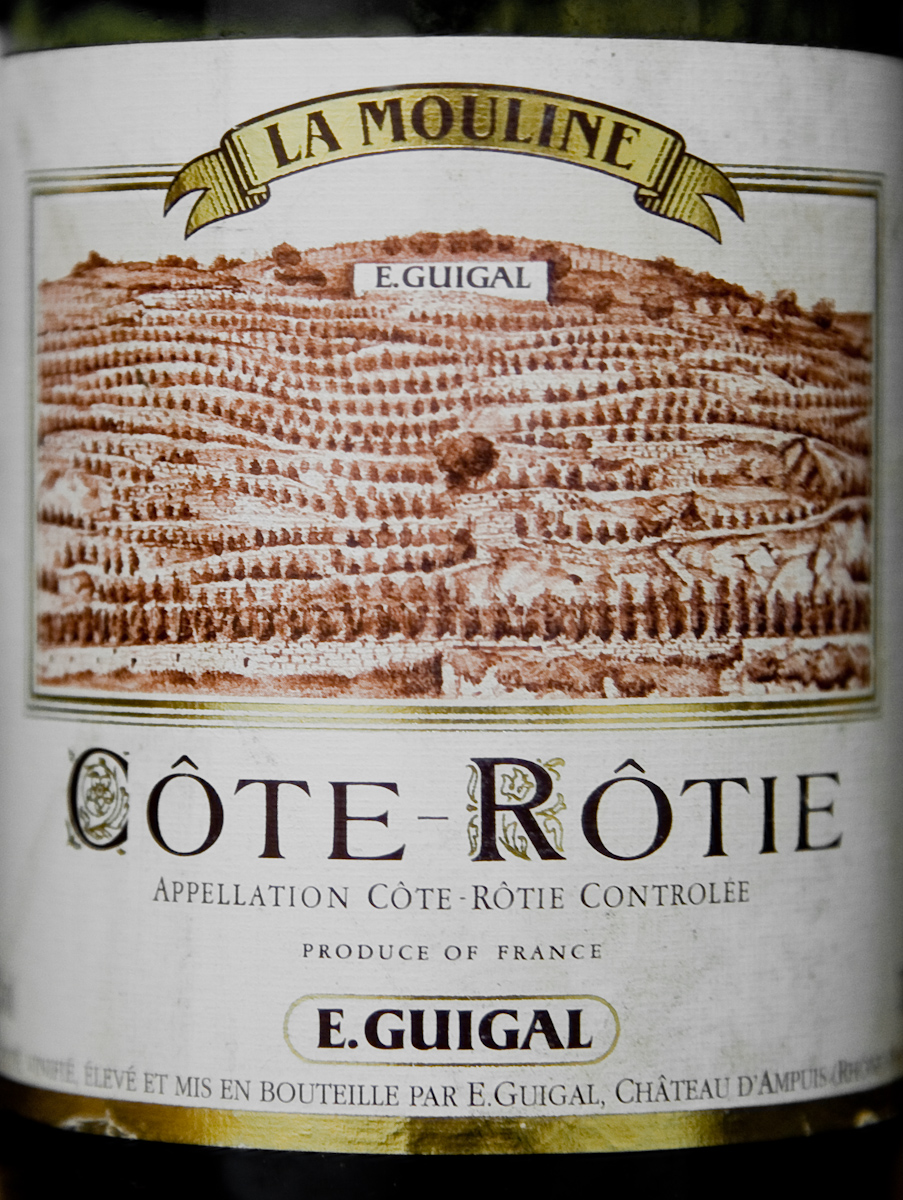
The label on a bottle of Guigal La Mouline one of the "La La's"

Guigal, formally Établissements Guigal, is a winery and négociant business situated in Ampuis in the northern part of the Rhône region in France. Guigal produces wine from appellations across the Rhône region, but is particularly noted for their Côte-Rôtie wines and played a pioneering role in improving Côte-Rôtie's international reputation. Guigal's single vineyard wines La Mouline, La Landonne and La Turque (sometimes referred to collectively as "La La's") are internationally renowned. In 2007, the release of the 2003 vintage of Guigal's "La La" wines set the record for most expensive release of any Rhone wine, with bottles retailing for as much as $800.

== History ==
Guigal was established in 1946 by Étienne Guigal, who had worked for Vidal Fleury for 15 years before setting up his own business. It has been managed by his son Marcel Guigal since 1961. In 1984, Guigal bought Vidal Fleury but continues to operate it as a separate business. In 2000, Guigal bought and absorbed two other wineries: the estate Jean-Louis Grippat in Saint-Joseph and the Domaine de Vallouit, with vineyard holdings in Côte-Rôtie, Hermitage, Saint-Joseph and Crozes-Hermitage, which added some high-end vineyards in other appellations to the Guigal range. In 2006 the Domaine de Bonserine was purchased by Guigal. In recent years, Marcel's son Philippe Guigal has been active as a winemaker at Guigal.

Guigal, under Marcel Guigal, came to international fame in the early- to mid-1980s when Robert M. Parker, Jr. followed by other wine critics heaped praise on Guigal's top Côte-Rôtie wines, in particular the three single vineyard wines La Mouline, La Landonne and La Turque. Parker comments that "In the past 26 years I have spent visiting wineries and vignerons, I have never seen a producer so fanatical about quality as Marcel Guigal." This attention contributed to the Rhône wines' improved international fame in general, and in particular led Côte-Rôtie to be seen more on par with Hermitage than in previous times. This also meant that the top Côte-Rôtie wines increased in price to reach and later follow and sometimes surpass that of the top Hermitage wines. In 2006 Marcel Guigal was awarded the Decanter Man of the Year award for his contribution and dedication to the Rhône.

== Wines and vineyard holdings ==
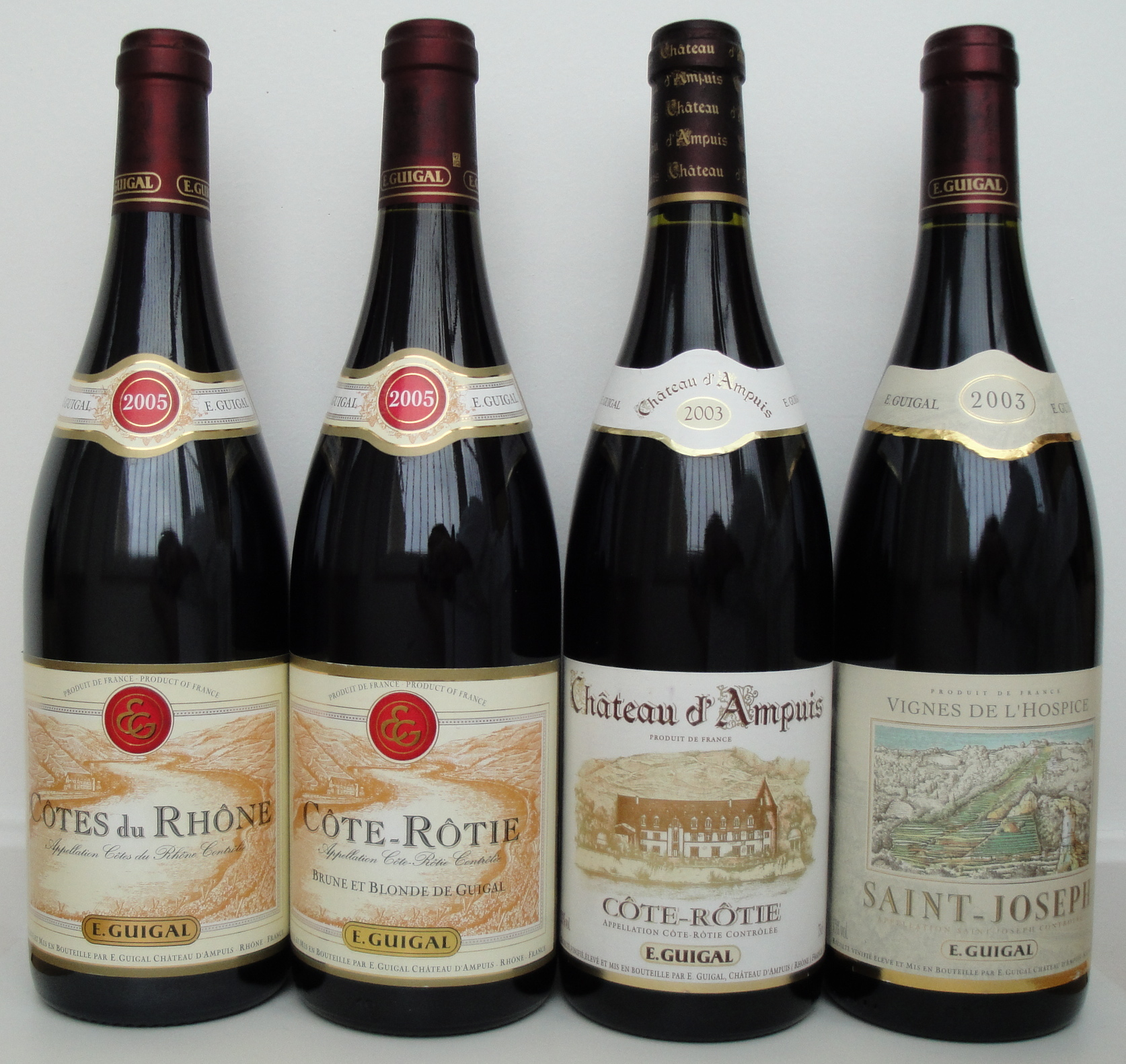
Four bottles of Guigal wine showing the different label designs. The two bottles on the left carry the standard Guigal label and the two bottles on the right are high-end wines with individual label designs.

Guigal produces a wide range of red, white and rosé wine from the northern and southern Rhône appellations. These wines are sold under the appellation's name with similar-looking wine labels across the range.

The high-end wines, on the other hand, have individual labels of very varying design and mostly carry vineyard designations, sometimes an official lieu-dit and sometimes Guigal's own designation. These wines are only produced from Guigal's own vineyards.

Guigals total vineyard holdings is slightly over 45 hectares (110 acres), of which around half is in Côte-Rôtie.

Of the 25,000 cases of wine typically made in the Condrieu appellation each vintage, around 45% is produced by Guigal.

=== Côte-Rôtie wines ===
The Côte-Rôtie wines, for which Guigal is most famous, are produced on three quality levels:

- Brune et Blonde de Guigal (previously known as just Brune et Blonde), the basic Côte-Rôtie carrying the names of the Côte Brune and Côte Blonde parts of the appellation, and featuring a standard Guigal label. Typically a blend of 4% Viognier and 96% Syrah.
- Château d'Ampuis, a blend of six vineyards of Côte Brune and Côte Blonde, and priced between the Brune et Blonde and the vineyard-designated wines. Typically a blend of 7% Viognier and 93% Syrah. Produced since the 1995 vintage, it is named after the 11th century fort and historical monument in Ampuis that was purchased in 1995, restored and setup as Guigal headquarters.
- La Landonne, a vineyard-designated wine made from 100% Syrah, and therefore often the most tannic of the three top wines. Produced since the 1978 vintage.
- La Mouline, a vineyard-designated wine from a parcel inside the lieu-dit Côte Blonde. Typically a blend of 11% Viognier and 89% Syrah and therefore often the most floral of three top wines. First vintage was 1966.
- La Turque, a vineyard-designated wine from a parcel inside the lieu-dit Côte Brune. Typically a blend of 7% Viognier and 93% Syrah and often described as intermediate between La Landonne and La Mouline in style. First vintage was 1985.

For the vineyard Côte-Rôties, Guigal has received more 100 point ratings by Robert M. Parker than any other single wine producer. As of 2009, this meant 21 wines, consisting of seven vintages of La Landonne (1985-2005), nine vintages of La Mouline (1976-2005), and five vintages of La Turque (1985-2005).

=== Other high-end wines ===
- Condrieu La Doriane, from the three lieux-dits Côte Chatillon, Colombier and Coteau de Chéry.
- Condrieu Luminiscence, a sweet Condrieu only produced in some vintages.
- Ermitage Ex Voto red, from old vines in the four lieux-dits Bessards, Greffieux, Murands and Hermite. 100% Syrah. Produced since the 2000 vintage.
- Ermitage Ex Voto white, from old vines in the two lieux-dits Murets (90% of the wine) and Hermite (10% of the wine). Typically a blend of 90% Marsanne and 10% Roussanne. Produced since the 2001 vintage.
- Saint-Joseph Lieu-dit Saint-Joseph red. 100% Syrah.
- Saint-Joseph Lieu-dit Saint-Joseph white. Typically a blend of 95% Marsanne and 5% Roussanne.
- Saint-Joseph Vignes de l'Hospice red. Produced from a formerly church-owned vineyard that was divided between the two estates of Grippat and Vallouit before it was bought by Guigal. 100% Syrah. Produced since the 1999 vintage and priced higher than the Lieu-dit Saint-Joseph wine.
