= Condrieu AOC =

French wine-growing region

Coordinates: 45°27′50″N 4°46′06″E

- Wine region
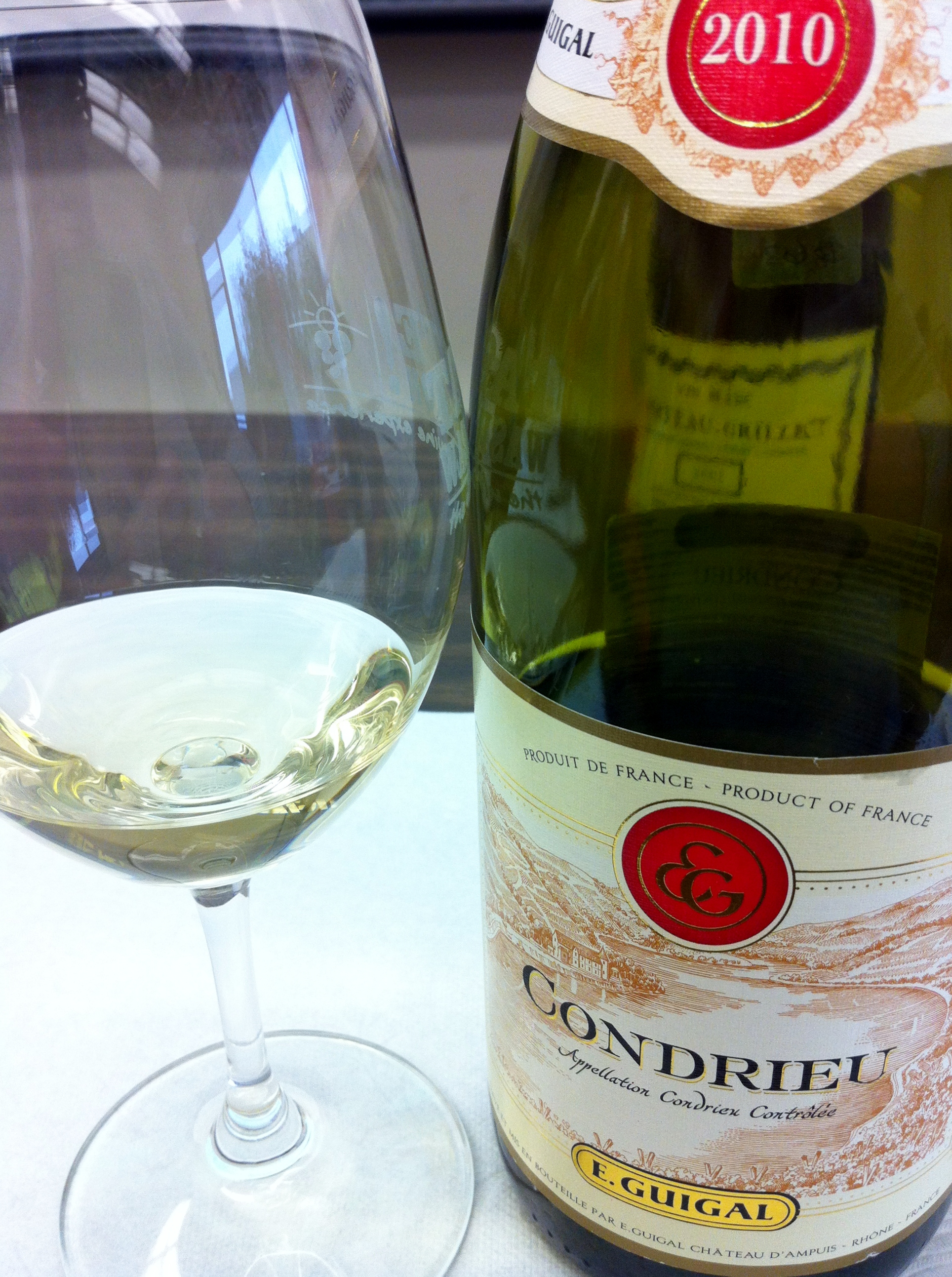
- Official name: Wine from the Condrieu AOC
- Type: AOC
- Year established: 1940
- Country: France
- Part of: Rhône Valley
- Climate region: mild continental
- Soil conditions: gneiss
- Total area: 202 ha
- No. of vineyards: 101
- Grapes produced: Viognier
- No. of wineries: 76
- Wine produced: sec, demi-sec, doux
- Comments: 2005

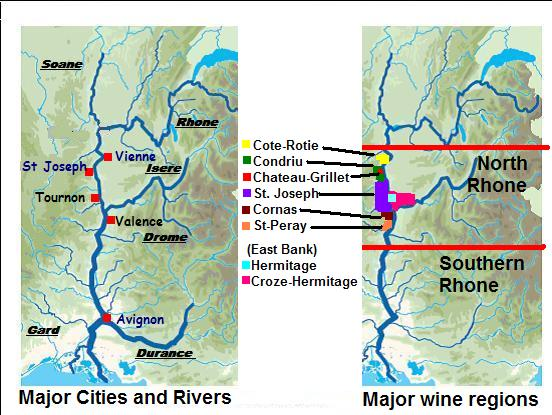
Location of the Condrieu AOC among the major in wine regions of the Northern Rhône

Condrieu (French pronunciation: [kɔ̃dʁijø]; from the French coin de ruisseau, lit. 'corner of the brook', pronounced [kwɛ̃ də ʁɥiso]) is a French wine-growing Appellation d'Origine Contrôlée (AOC) located in the northern Rhône, near Vienne and to the south of the Côte-Rôtie AOC. The vineyards are situated in the seven communes of Limony, Chavanay, Malleval, Saint-Michel-sur-Rhône, Saint-Pierre-de Boeuf, Vérin, and Condrieu. These communes are in the French departments of Ardèche, Rhône and Loire on the steep slopes of the foothills of the Massif Central on the right bank of the Rhône. The four southernmost communes can also produce wine under the Saint-Joseph AOC. The wines made in this AOC are exclusively white, from the Viognier grape, which may have originated in the region. The smaller AOC of Château-Grillet is enclaved within Condrieu and produces wines that are also 100% Viognier. The Condrieu AOC was officially created in 1940.

== History ==
Viticulture in the area around Condrieu has existed since at least Roman times and it is possible that the area was first cultivated by the native Allobroges tribe. In the 18th century, Condrieu enjoyed a period of popularity as it gained access to the lucrative Parisian market. The wine was transported north by land to the city of Saint-Étienne where the Loire would carry the wine to the Canal de Briare and then to Paris. During periods of peace between France and Great Britain, Condrieu would find its way to the London market.

For most of the 20th century before the early 1970s, the only northern Rhône wine well-known far from the region was Hermitage, and there was little demand on the export market for Rhône wines. Producing wine from hillside vineyards requires more labour than on flat vineyards, and is therefore economically difficult when demand and prices are low. This was particularly felt by some Rhône appellations in the early post-World War II era, including Condrieu and its neighbour Côte-Rôtie, with the 1950s and 1960s a particularly difficult time. Rhône wines in general started to be more in demand from the early 1970s, and stronger so from the late 1970s/early 1980s. From this time, the négociant business of Marcel Guigal at Ampuis helped expand the market for Condrieu wines. Guigal primarily made his name with his Côte-Rôtie wines which then paved the way for his bottlings from other appellations, which also includes a significant portion of white wine. Guigal's Condrieu was sourced from small growers in the appellation.

The increase in demand led to new plantations inside the appellation's border, which at the time was far from fully exploited and at one stage included many abandoned vineyards. The area under vine was less than 12 hectares (30 acres) in the 1960s, 14 hectares (35 acres) in 1982, 98 hectares (240 acres) at the end of the century and 135 hectares (330 acres) in 2005.

== Climate and geography ==
As in much of Northern Rhone, the climate of Condrieu is continental and characterized by cold wet winters and hot summers. Ideally situated vineyards are planted on granite soils and face south, which aids growth during the cool months of late spring and early autumn. The well-drained granite soil retains heat during the day and reflects it back to the vines at night. In some areas the soil includes a fine layer of decomposed chalk, flint and mica which is known in the region as arzelle. The best vineyards have some natural shelter from the fierce northern winds that blow through the region and wreak havoc during flowering. The steep incline of many vineyards exposes them to soil erosion.

The Condrieu AOC covers more than 500 acres (202 ha) of hilly terrain located along a 12 miles (19 km) stretch of the Rhône. The AOC region begins at the town of Condrieu and extends south along the west bank of the river to the town of Limony. Within the AOC is 8.5 acres (3.4 ha) of Château-Grillet, which has its own micro-appellation.

== Wine ==
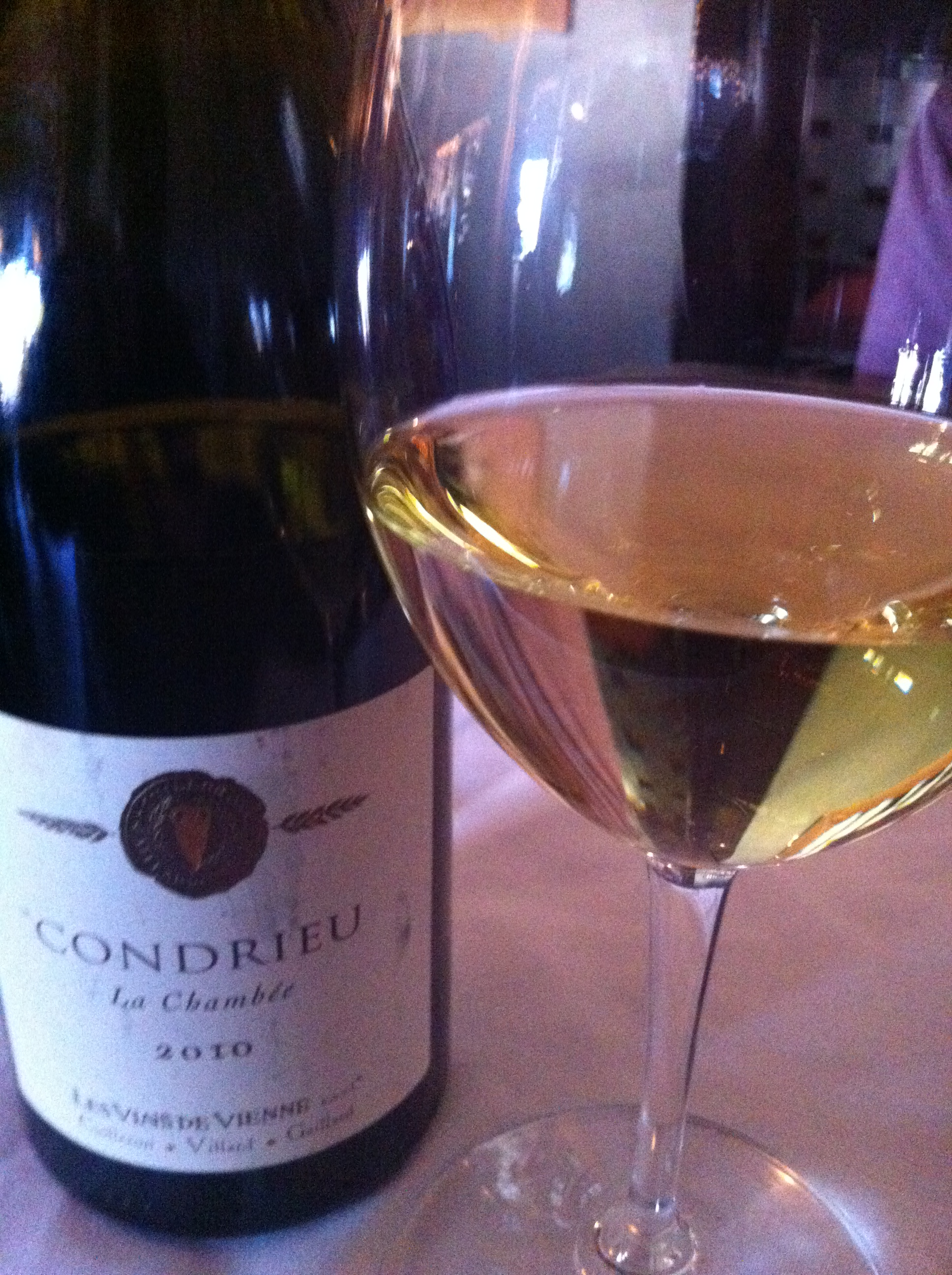
A Condrieu wine

The only wine that can be sold under the Condrieu AOC is a white wine made entirely from Viognier. The clone of Viognier grown in Condrieu produces low yields of small berries and is less productive than the clones planted in other regions of France, such as the vin de pays wine of the neighboring Ardèche department. This contributes to the expense of Condrieu AOC wine, of which only 30 000 or so cases are produced annually. In the early to mid 20th century, Condrieu producers tended to make wines that were off-dry to sweet but by the end of the century the trend was to produce mostly dry wines. In particularly favourable vintages, some producers will make a sweet late harvest wine.

Condrieu wine is often characterised by delicate aromatics of peaches, dried fruit and white flowers. Some examples also have notes of anise, star fruit and melons. Often the wine is full bodied and rich in a style that is texturally similarly to Chardonnay. Normally the wine is made dry but the fruitiness and perfume of the bouquet can suggest sweetness. The Viognier grape is naturally low in acidity, which challenges growers and winemakers to keep the wine from becoming flabby and bleak. Some winemakers in the region use malolactic fermentation and some do not. The delicate flavors of the wine can be overwhelmed by too much oak during the winemaking process.

=== Aging ===
The ability of Condrieu to age is much discussed in the wine industry and opinions differ. Some experts like Master of Wine Mary Ewing-Mulligan believe that it is best consumed within three years of harvest. The Oxford Companion to Wine describes Condrieu as one of the few luxury wines that is meant to be consumed young, typically within two to four years. Wine writer Tom Stevenson recommends drinking Condrieu within four to eight years of harvest and notes that its freshness and purity can be lost as the wine ages. James Molesworth of Wine Spectator notes that some vintages of Condrieu, such as the 2004, will produce more intense, concentrated wines that will age gracefully.

== Appellation regulations ==
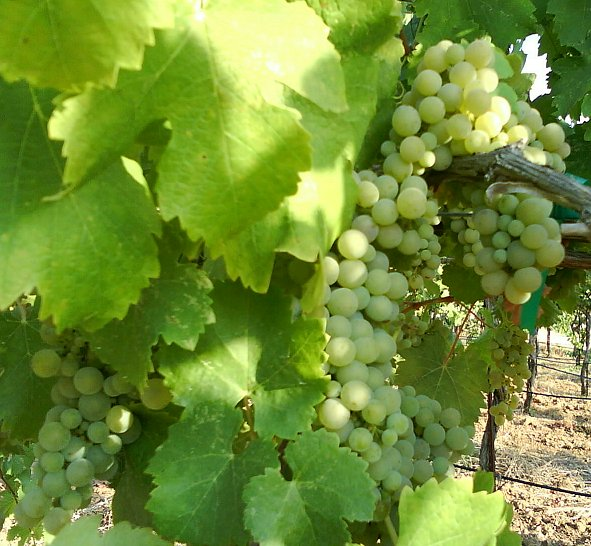
Viognier grapes

The Condrieu AOC can only be used for still white wines made from Viognier. The planting density must be at least 6 500 vines per hectare, and the base yield is 41 hectoliter per hectare. The grape must reach a maturity giving at least 178 g/L sugar in the must (corresponding to 10.5 per cent potential alcohol) and the finished wines must have at least 11.5 per cent alcohol by volume, but no more than 14 per cent after any chaptalisation. If the wine has more than 45 grams per liter of sugar (only applicable for rare sweet Condrieu wines), it must not have been chaptalised to reach that sugar level.
