= Chapoutier =

French winery and négociant

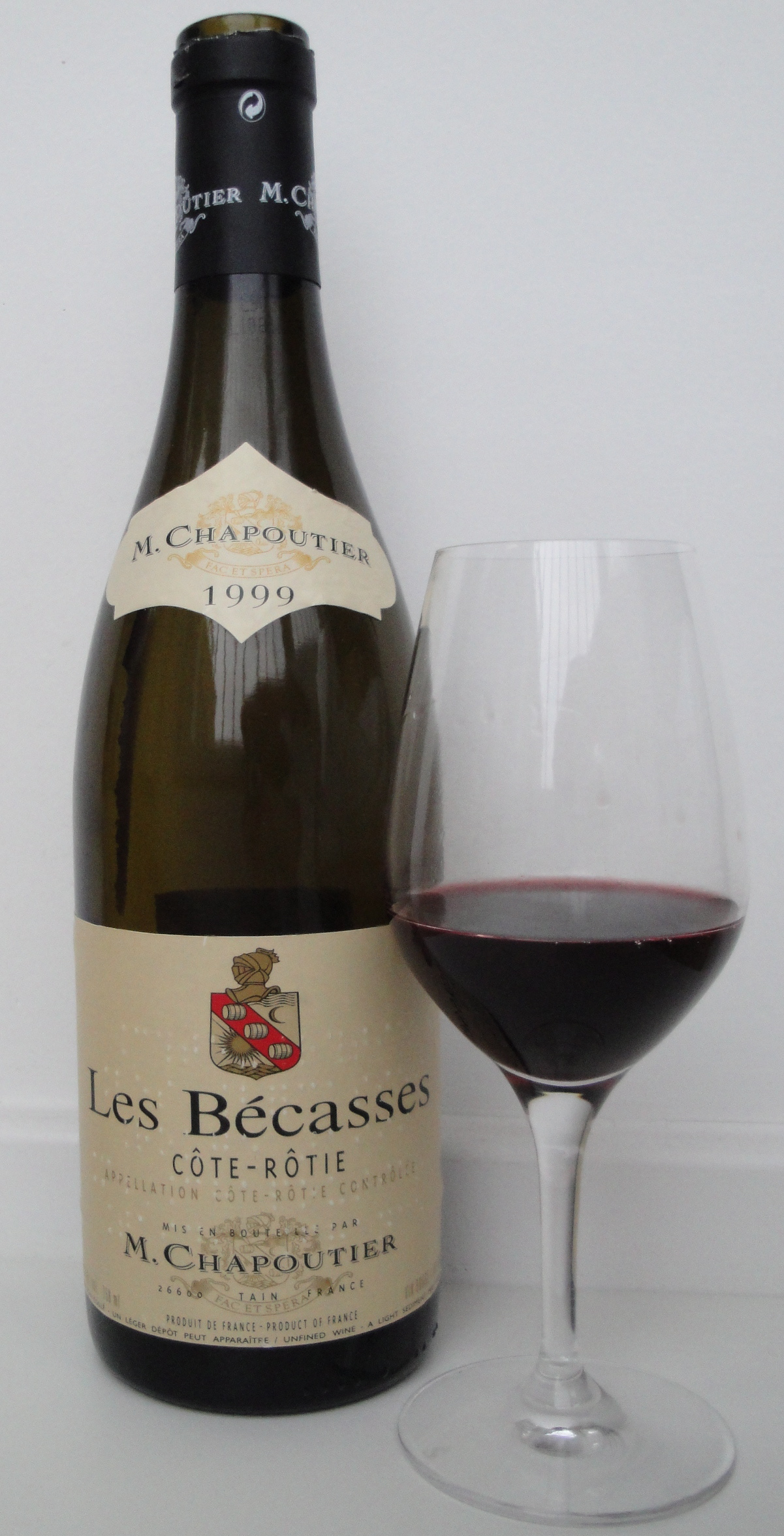
A wine from Chapoutier, a Les Bécasses from the Côte-Rôtie appellation

Chapoutier, or Maison M. Chapoutier, is a winery and négociant business situated in Tain-l'Hermitage in the Rhône region of France. Chapoutier produces wine from appellations across the Rhône region, but it is typically their Hermitage wines, both red and white, that receive the most attention. Chapoutier's wine labels are distinctive because of their inclusion of Braille writing on all labels since 1996.

== History ==
The Chapoutier family can trace their history in the Rhône region back to 1808, but it was in 1879 that Polydor Chapoutier bought his first vineyards and started the actual business. In the mid-20th century Max Chapoutier led the business, until his retirement in 1977, after which his sons Michel Chapoutier and Marc Chapoutier took over. Some years later, during the 1980s, there were reported improvements in wine production techniques, under Michel Chapoutier's leadership over the vineyards and winemaking facilities. By the late 1980s, Chapoutier began gaining international recognition for the quality of its wines.

== Vineyards and wines ==
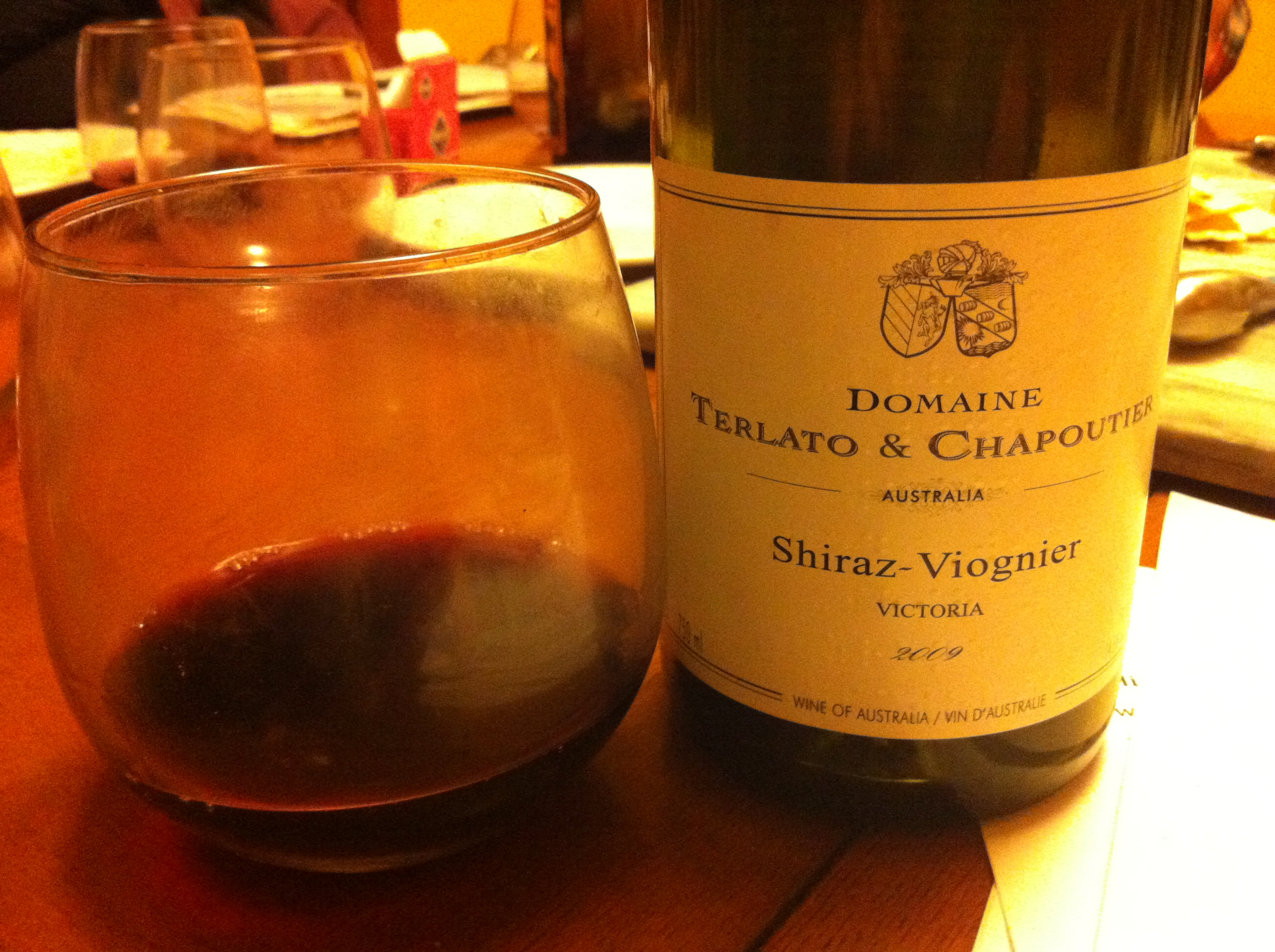
An Australian Shiraz-Viognier made in Victoria through a collaboration with Terlato and Chapoutier

Chapoutier produces wines from a range of appellations in the northern and southern parts of the Rhône, as well as from some Roussillon appellations, and from collaborative projects in Portugal and Australia. The Chapoutier vineyards are all managed to produce biodynamic wines. A further characteristic of Chapoutier is a preference for single-variety wines, even in appellations where blends are common. Thus, Chapoutier's Côte-Rôties are Syrah only (with no Viognier), the white Hermitages are all Marsanne only (with no Roussanne) and several of the Châteauneuf-du-Papes are Grenache noir only.

The winery's range of Rhône wines are grouped into four quality levels. The two basic levels are referred to as "Découverte" and "Tradition", the intermediate level "Prestige", and the top level "Fac&Spera". Wines at the Fac&Spera level are produced from the appellations Côte-Rôtie, Hermitage, Crozes-Hermitage, Saint-Joseph, Cornas, and Châteauneuf-du-Pape. Chapoutier has built a reputation for its white wines in northern Rhône, an area predominantly known for its reds, and the winery has developed several notable white wines from these appellations. Of the fifteen wines in the "Fac&Spera" range, ten are red and five white, including one sweet white wine, a Hermitage Vin de Paille. In 2025 he French winery has planted 2,000 agave plants in an abandoned vineyard in the Rhône Valley. The reason for this is climate change, with increasingly dry summers and more intense heat waves. Until now, Chapoutier has been producing a Côtes-du-Rhône Villages on the Domaine Roc Folassière plot in the Gard department.

== Braille labeling ==
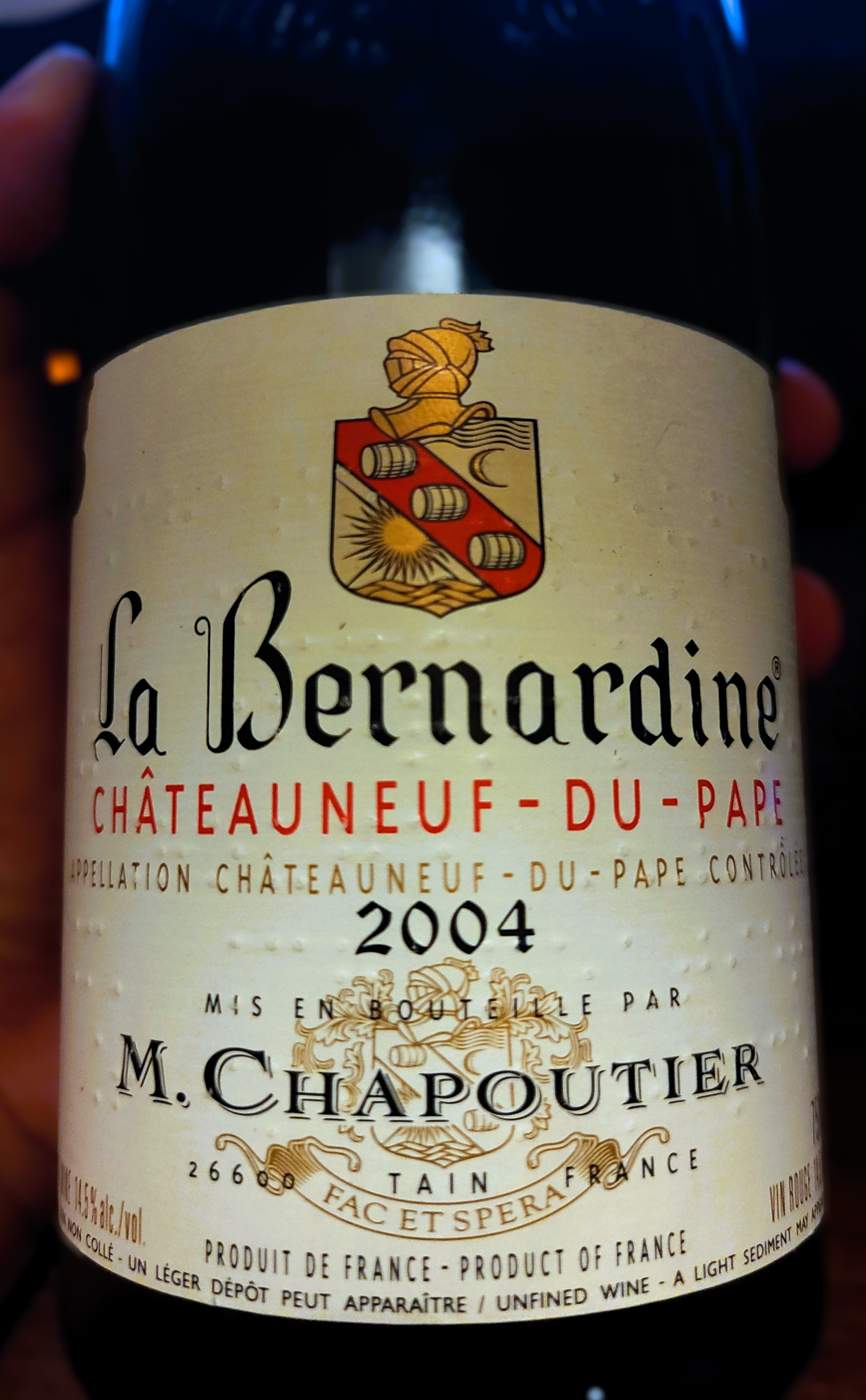
A Chapoutier Châteauneuf-du-Pape wine label with braille

Chapoutier was the first wine producer to introduce Braille on its labels, starting in 1994 with the Monier de la Sizeranne Hermitage wine. By 1996 this was expanded to include all wines bottled and sold by the Chapoutier winery. Michel Chapoutier had the idea to include Braille on the label after hearing his friend Gilbert Montagné, a blind singer, explaining on TV that he would have to take someone with him into the store in order to identify each bottle of wine. The Monier de la Sizeranne vineyard that Chapoutier now owns and makes wine from, was founded by the Sizeranne family and the first and subsequent braille printing on this wine is a tribute to that family and specifically a blind member of the family, Maurice de La Sizeranne who was the founder and president of the French Association for the Blind and also developed an abbreviated version of braille.

The information presented in the braille print includes the producer, the vintage, the vineyard and region as well as the colour of the wine.
