= Cofermentation =

Cofermentation may refer to:

- Cofermentation (biogas)
- Cofermentation (wine), the simultaneous fermentation of two varieties of grape in winemaking
