= 69007 =

69007 could refer to:

- 7th arrondissement of Lyon, France
- Ampuis, a commune in Rhône, France
- Facility ID of KRUA, a radio station at the University of Alaska Anchorage
- 2002 TN217, a minor planet; see List of minor planets: 69001–70000
