= Rebel Coast Winery =

Winery in Hermosa Beach, California

- Location: Sonoma, California, USA
- Founded: 2013; 12 years ago
- Key people: Chip Forsythe, Alex Howe
- Known for: Reckless Love
- Varietals: Cabernet Sauvignon, Syrah, Chardonnay, Sauvignon Blanc, Viognier
- Other products: Marijuana infused Sauvignon Blanc
- Website: www.rebelcoast.com

Rebel Coast Winery is a winery in Hermosa Beach, California.

Rebel Coast was started in 2013 by Kate Seiberlich, Doug Burkett, and Chip Forsythe (an alumnus of California Polytechnic State University). Rebel Coast makes a red wine called Reckless Love, a white wine called Sunday Funday and another red called Lost by Choice.

In late 2017, Rebel Coast announced the release of a THC-infused Sauvignon Blanc. The plan was to ship the wine only to customers in US states where recreational use of marijuana was legal.
