= Co-fermentation =

Wine making process

Co-fermentation is the practice in winemaking of fermenting two or more fruits at the same time when producing a wine. This differs from the more common practice of blending separate wine components into a cuvée after fermentation. While co-fermentation in principle could be practiced for any mixture of grape varieties or other fruits, it is today more common for red wines produced from a mixture of red grape varieties and a smaller proportion of white grape varieties.

Co-fermentation is an old practice going back to the now uncommon practice of having field blends (mixed plantations of varieties) in vineyards, and the previous practice in some regions (such as Rioja and Tuscany) of using a small proportion of white grapes to "soften" some red wines which tended to have harsh tannins when produced with the winemaking methods of the time. It is believed that the practice may also have been adopted because it was found empirically to give deeper and better colour to wines, which is due to improved co-pigmentation resulting from some components in white grapes.

== Use today ==
The only classical Old World wine region where co-fermentation is still widely practiced is now the Côte-Rôtie appellation of northern Rhône, while the use of white varieties in red Rioja and Tuscany wine has more or less disappeared. In Côte-Rôtie, the red variety Syrah and the aromatic white variety Viognier (up to 20% is allowed, but 5–10% is more common) must be co-fermented, if Viognier is used. The reason why Viognier has been kept in Côte-Rôtie (while for example the white grapes Marsanne and Roussanne are hardly found any more in red Hermitage or other red Rhône wines where they are allowed) is that it adds signature floral aromas to the wines. The popularity of Côte-Rôtie has led to New World interpretations of this blend, most notably Australian Shiraz-Viognier blends, which are also produced by co-fermentation.

The reason why co-fermentation is not more widely practiced is that it "locks in" a certain blend already at the start of the fermentation, which gives the winemaker less possibility to adjust the blend after fermentation.

Co-fermentation is also performed in situations where field blend varietals are indistinguishable from each other, thus necessitating co-fermentation.
