= North =

One of the four cardinal directions

A 16-point compass rose with north highlighted and at the top

North is one of the four compass points or cardinal directions. It is the opposite of south and is perpendicular to east and west. North is a noun, adjective, or adverb indicating direction or geography.

== Etymology ==
The word north is related to the Old High German nord, both descending from the Proto-Indo-European unit *ner-, meaning "left; below" as north is to left when facing the rising sun. Similarly, the other cardinal directions are also related to the sun's position.

The Latin word borealis comes from the Greek boreas "north wind, north" which, according to Ovid, was personified as the wind-god Boreas, the father of Calais and Zetes. Septentrionalis is from septentriones, "the seven plow oxen", a name of Ursa Major. The Greek ἀρκτικός (arktikós) is named for the same constellation, and is the source of the English word Arctic.

Other languages have other derivations. For example, in Lezgian, kefer can mean both "disbelief" and "north", since to the north of the Muslim Lezgian homeland there are areas formerly inhabited by non-Muslim Caucasian and Turkic peoples. In many languages of Mesoamerica, north also means "up".

In Romanian the old word for north is mĭazănoapte, from Latin mediam noctem meaning midnight and in Hungarian is észak, which is derived from éjszaka ("night"), since between the Tropic of Cancer and the Arctic Circle the Sun never shines from the north.

North is sometimes abbreviated as N.

== Mapping and navigation ==
By convention, the top or upward-facing side of a map is north.

To go north using a compass for navigation, set a bearing or azimuth of 0° or 360°. Traveling directly north traces a meridian line upwards.

North is specifically the direction that, in Western culture, is considered the fundamental direction:

- North is used (explicitly or implicitly) to define all other directions.
- The (visual) top edges of maps usually correspond to the northern edge of the area represented, unless explicitly stated otherwise or landmarks are considered more useful for that territory than specific directions.
- On any rotating astronomical object, north often denotes the side appearing to rotate counterclockwise when viewed from afar along the axis of rotation. However, the International Astronomical Union (IAU) defines the geographic north pole of a planet or any of its satellites in the Solar System as the planetary pole that is in the same celestial hemisphere, relative to the invariable plane of the Solar System, as Earth's north pole. This means some objects, such as Uranus, rotate in the retrograde direction: when seen from the IAU north, the spin is clockwise.

== Magnetic north and declination ==
Magnetic north is of interest because it is the direction indicated as north on a properly functioning (but uncorrected) magnetic compass. The difference between it and true north is called the magnetic declination (or simply the declination where the context is clear). For many purposes and physical circumstances, the error in direction that results from ignoring the distinction is tolerable; in others a mental or instrument compensation, based on assumed knowledge of the applicable declination, can solve all the problems. But simple generalizations on the subject should be treated as unsound, and as likely to reflect popular misconceptions about terrestrial magnetism.

Maps intended for usage in orienteering by compass will clearly indicate the local declination for easy correction to true north. Maps may also indicate grid north, which is a navigational term referring to the direction northwards along the grid lines of a map projection.

== Roles of north as prime direction ==
The visible rotation of the night sky around the visible celestial pole provides a vivid metaphor of that direction corresponding to "up". Thus, the choice of the north as corresponding to "up" in the Northern Hemisphere, or of south in that role in the southern, is, before worldwide communication, anything but an arbitrary one - at least for night-time astronomers. (Note: the Southern Hemisphere lacks a prominent visible analog to the northern Pole Star.) On the contrary, Chinese and Islamic cultures considered south as the proper "top" end for maps. In the cultures of Polynesia, where navigation played an important role, winds - prevailing local or ancestral - can define cardinal points.

In Western culture:

- Maps tend to be drawn for viewing with either true north or magnetic north at the top.
- Globes of the Earth have the North Pole at the top, or if the Earth's axis is represented as inclined from vertical (normally by the angle it has relative to the axis of the Earth's orbit), in the top half.
- Maps are usually labelled to indicate which direction on the map corresponds to a direction on the Earth,
  - usually with a single arrow oriented to the map's representation of true north,
  - occasionally with a single arrow oriented to the map's representation of magnetic north, or two arrows oriented to true and magnetic north respectively,
  - occasionally with a compass rose, but if so, usually on a map with north at the top and usually with north decorated more prominently than any other compass point.
- "Up" is a metaphor for north. The notion that north should always be "up" and east at the right was established by the Greek astronomer Ptolemy. The historian Daniel Boorstin suggests that perhaps this was because the better-known places in his world were in the northern hemisphere, and on a flat map these were most convenient for study if they were in the upper right-hand corner.

North is quite often associated with colder climates because most of the world's populated land at high latitudes is located in the Northern Hemisphere. The Arctic Circle passes through the Arctic Ocean, Norway, Sweden, Finland, Russia, the United States (Alaska), Canada (Yukon, Northwest Territories and Nunavut), Denmark (Greenland) and Iceland.

== Roles of east and west as inherently subsidiary directions ==
While the choice of north over south as prime direction reflects quite arbitrary historical factors, east and west are not nearly as natural alternatives as first glance might suggest. Their folk definitions are, respectively, "where the sun rises" and "where it sets". Except on the Equator, however, these definitions, taken together, would imply that

- east and west would not be 180 degrees apart, but instead would differ from that by up to twice the degrees of latitude of the location in question, and
- they would each move slightly from day to day and, in the temperate zones, markedly over the course of the year.

Reasonably accurate folk astronomy, such as is usually attributed to Stone Age peoples or later Celts, would arrive at east and west by noting the directions of rising and setting (preferably more than once each) and choosing as prime direction one of the two mutually opposite directions that lie halfway between those two. The true folk-astronomical definitions of east and west are "the directions, a right angle from the prime direction, that are closest to the rising and setting, respectively, of the sun (or moon).

== Cultural references ==
Being the "default" direction on the compass, north is referred to frequently in Western popular culture. Some examples include:

- "North of X" is a phrase often used by Americans to mean "more than X" or "greater than X" in relation to the conventional direction of north being upwards, i.e. "The world population is north of 7 billion people" or "north of 40 [years old]".

== See also ==
- Nordicity
- List of northernmost items
- Northing
- Northern Light
- Septentrional
