= Côte-Rôtie AOC =

French wine geographic appellation

- Wine region
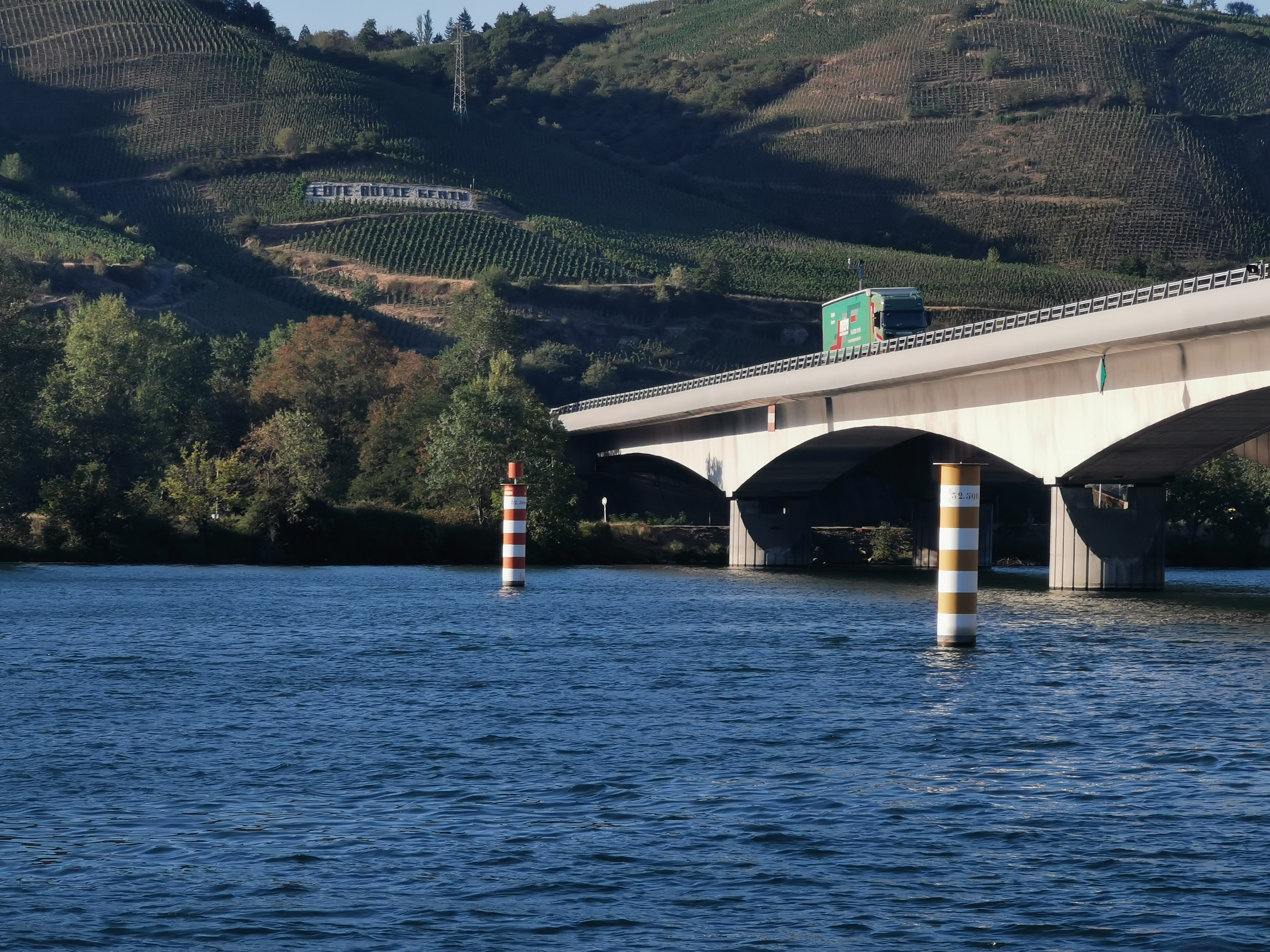
- Official name: Côte-Rôtie
- Type: Appellation d'origine contrôlée
- Year established: 1940
- Country: France
- Part of: Northern Rhone
- Other regions in Northern Rhone: Crozes-Hermitage, Cornas, Hermitage, Saint-Joseph
- Climate region: continental climate
- Size of planted vineyards: 224 hectares (550 acres).
- Grapes produced: Syrah, Viognier

Côte-Rôtie (French pronunciation: [kot ʁoti]) is a French wine Appellation d'origine contrôlée (AOC) in the northern Rhône wine region of France. The vineyards are located just south of Vienne in the communes of Saint-Cyr-sur-le-Rhône, Ampuis, and Tupin-et-Semons. The vineyards are unique because of the steep slopes facing the river and their stone walls. Côte-Rôtie can be rendered in English as "the roasted slope" and refers to the long hours of sunlight that these steep slopes receive.

The wines are red, made with Syrah grapes and up to 20% Viognier, a white grape used for its aroma. According to appellation rules, Syrah and Viognier (if used) must be fermented at the same time, a process known as cofermentation. Because of this combination, Côte-Rôtie wine typically exhibits an almost paradoxical pairing of meat aromas (including bacon) and floral aromas.

== Climate and geography ==
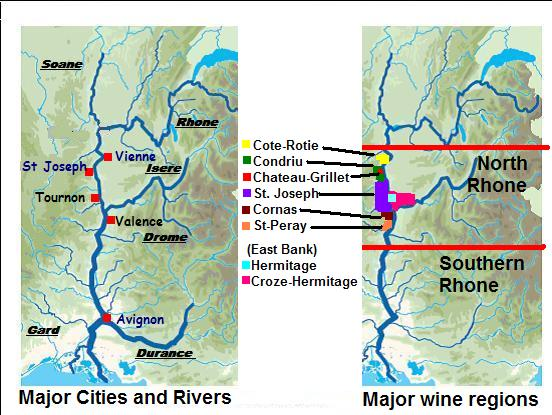
Location of the Côte-Rôtie AOC among the major in wine regions of the Northern Rhône

The Côte-Rôtie, and more generally the northern Rhône, has a continental climate that is very different from the more Mediterranean climate of the southern Rhône. Winters are wet and marked by the cold mistral winds that can last into the spring. During the late spring and early autumn, fog can settle on the vineyards making the ripening of grapes a challenge. The wine region covers 202 hectares (500 acres) along the western bank of the Rhône River near the village of Ampuis. In the Côte-Rôtie, the Rhône flows southwest for 9.7 kilometers (6.0 mi). To maximize the amount of sunshine that the vines receive (especially with the fog that often develops near the grape harvest time), vineyards will more often be planted on the south- or southeast-facing slopes along this part of the river. The Côte-Rôtie is subdivided into two main sections of varying soil compositions - the Côte Brune ("brown slope") in the north on dark, iron-rich schist and the Côte Blonde with its pale granite and schist soil. Erosion is a common viticultural hazard on these steep vineyards. The granite and schist soils are vital in retaining heat throughout the day to protect the vines from the chilly temperatures during the mistral seasons. Stone walls are built around the lands, and the hillsides are often heavily terraced to try to counter the issues. Some vineyard owners gather the eroded soils and rocks in buckets and carry them back up the slope to the vines.

== Grapes and wine ==
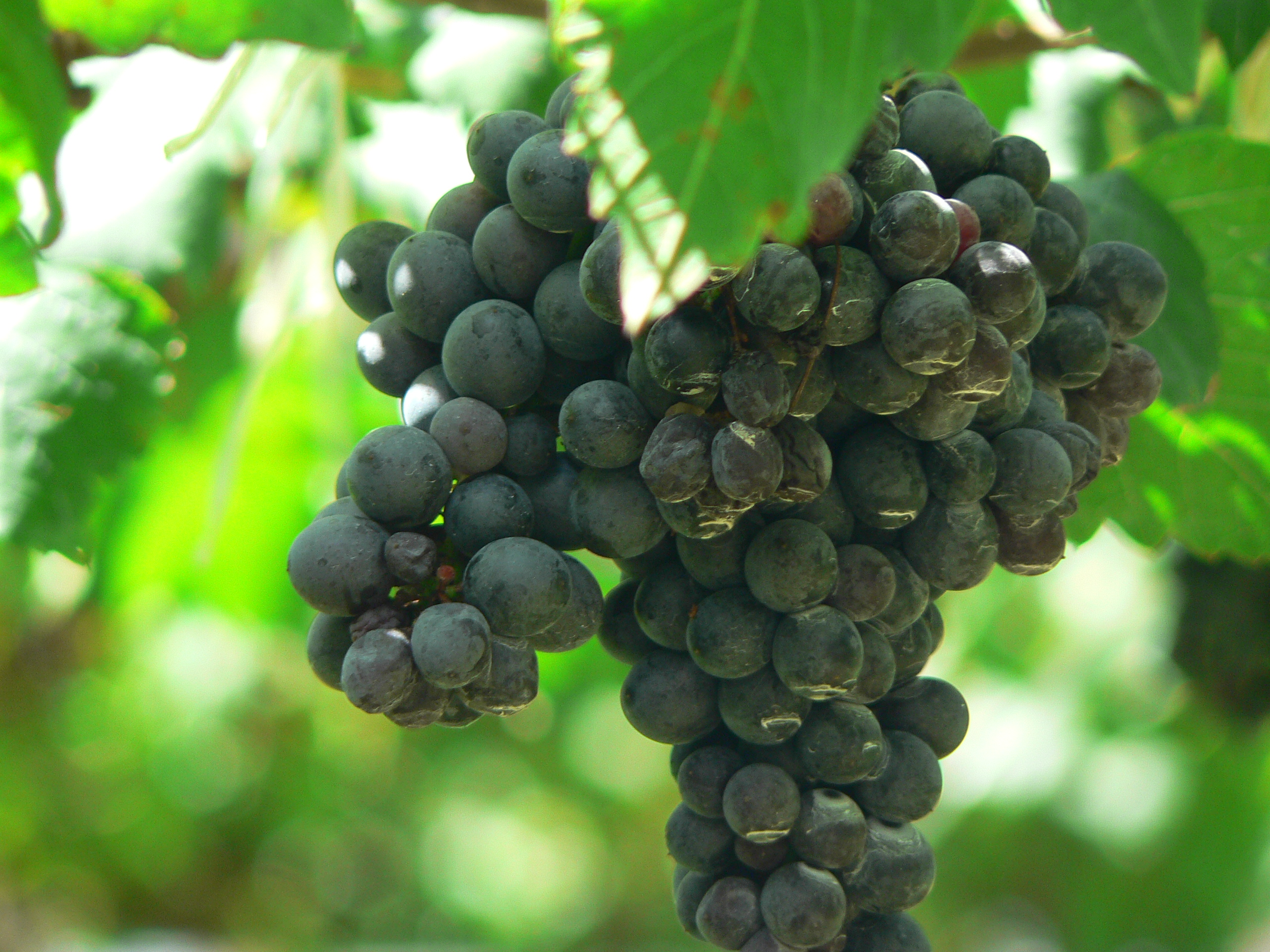
Syrah vine.

Syrah and Viognier are the only permitted grape varieties of the Côte-Rôtie AOC. While many of the region's wines are made of 100% Syrah, up to 20% of Viognier can be added to the wine. The wines are often meant to be consumed 5–6 years after vinification but well-made examples can need 10–15 years to fully develop their flavors with some wines having the aging potential of over 20 years. The most distinctive characteristic of all Côte-Rôtie wine is the aroma. The fragrant notes of these wines often include green olives, raspberry, violets, and meaty bacon. Other flavors commonly associated with Côte-Rôtie wine include black pepper, white pepper, blueberry, blackberry, plum, and leather. The vines of the region are very old, with 40 years being an average and some vines being over 100. This produces low wine yields of very flavor-concentrated fruit. Most of the vineyards used for producing Côte-Rôtie AOC are planted on the slopes of nearly 60° incline. The appellation extends to the flatter plateau above the slopes but the wine there is generally of lower quality and is sold with the more generic Côtes du Rhône AOC.

Legend has that the two sub-regions of the Côte-Rôtie, Côte Blonde and Côte Brune, were named after the blonde and brown hair colored daughters of a local lord who had two very different personalities. Similarly, the wines of both regions also have different characteristics. Wines of the Côte Blonde are often more balanced, elegant and meant to be consumed earlier. Wines of the iron-rich Côte Brune contain more tannins, are full-bodied and meant to age longer in the bottle prior to being consumed. Traditionally, most Côte-Rôtie wines are blends of grapes from the two sub-regions, incorporating both sets of distinctive qualities.

In recent years, more single vineyard designated wines have been produced that emphasize the terroir of that vineyard. Marcel Guigal was an early pioneer in single vineyard bottling. Some of the most prestigious vineyards in the Côte-Rôtie include, La Chatillone, La Chevalière, La Garde, La Landonne, La Mouline, La Turque.

=== Winemaking ===
The Côte-Rôtie is one of the few wine appellations that allow white wine grapes to be used in a blend of red wine. (The southern Rhône region Châteauneuf-du-Pape AOC is another.) The region was also one of the first Rhône regions to make use of new oak barrels for aging, though the practice fell out of favor in the late 19th century following the phylloxera epidemic. Négociants revived the practice in the 1980s and today its use varies according to the producer.

== History ==
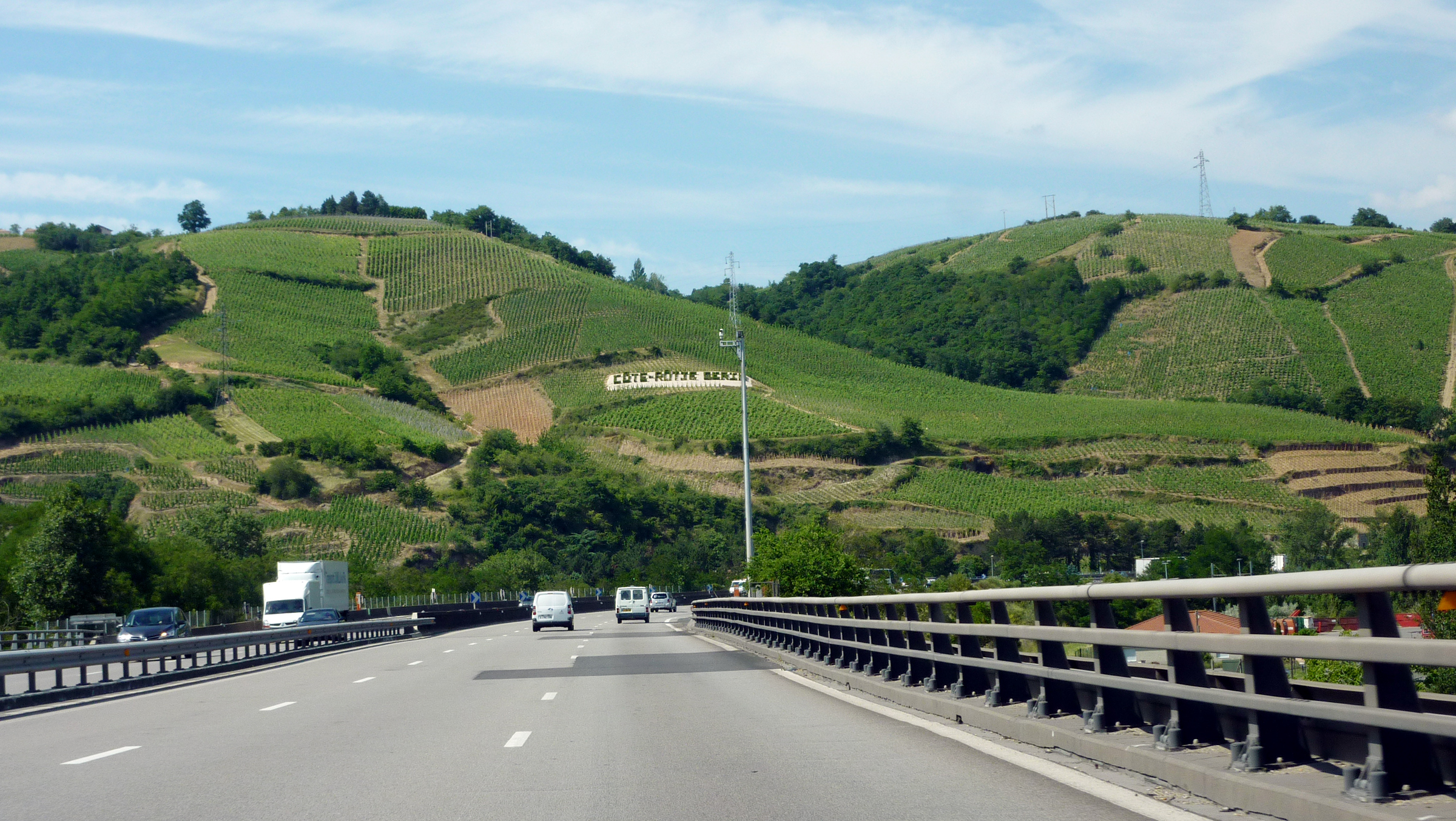
Côte-Rôtie vineyards near Vienne

The earliest record of viticulture in the region dates to the 2nd century BC when the Romans first encountered the Allobroges tribe whose territory included the regions around Vienne. While winemaking continued to have a long history in the region, the Côte-Rôtie did not receive much recognition until the 18th century when Parisians began discovering the wines of Beaujolais and Rhône. Around the same time, the British also discovered the wines with the purchase logs of John Hervey, 1st Earl of Bristol providing one of the earliest English records of "Côte-Rôty" (sic) wine. There were added considerations with the transportation of Côte-Rôtie wine, with the region using 20-U.S.-gallon (76-liter) amphora-like vases for transport instead of barrels or early wine bottles.

Until a few decades ago, Côte-Rôtie was not a serious competitor to Hermitage, which was the best-known northern Rhône vineyard internationally. Demand for Rhône wines began to grow in the early 1970s, and this growth accelerated from the late 1970s/early 1980s. For Côte-Rôtie it was the wines of Marcel Guigal which gave the appellation increased attention from the early 1980s. This included top marks from international wine critics for Guigal's wines La Mouline and La Landonne. This increase in demand led to new vineyards being created. From 1982 to 2005, the area with planted vines increased from 102 hectares (250 acres) to 231 hectares (570 acres).

The origins of the Côte-Rôtie most famous planting—Syrah—is confirmed to be indigenous to the Rhone valley. Syrah has been genetically shown to be a cross between Mondeuse Blanche and Dureza.
