= Château-Grillet AOC =

Wine-growing AOC in France

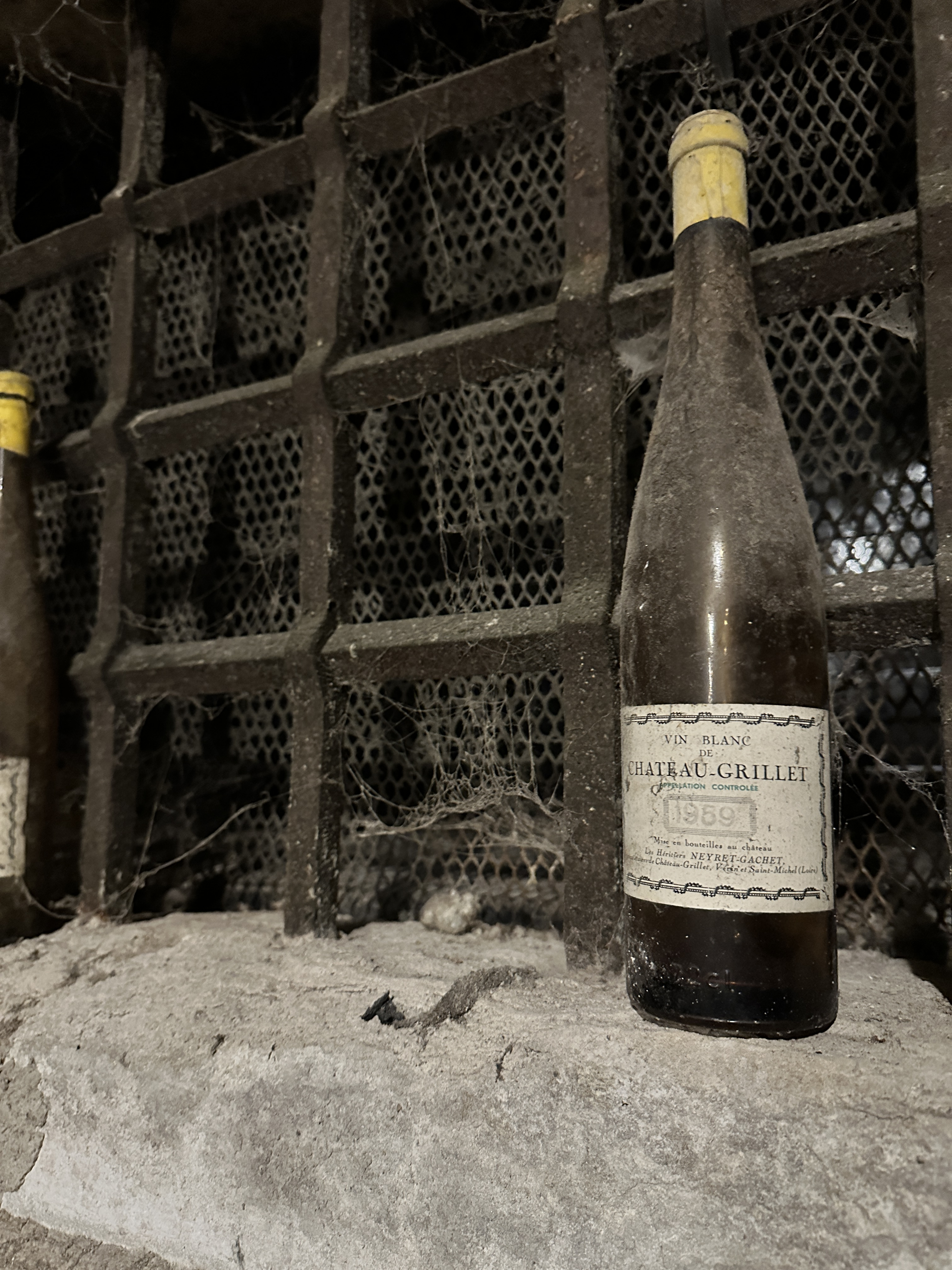
Viognier wine from Château Grillet, 1959 Vintage.

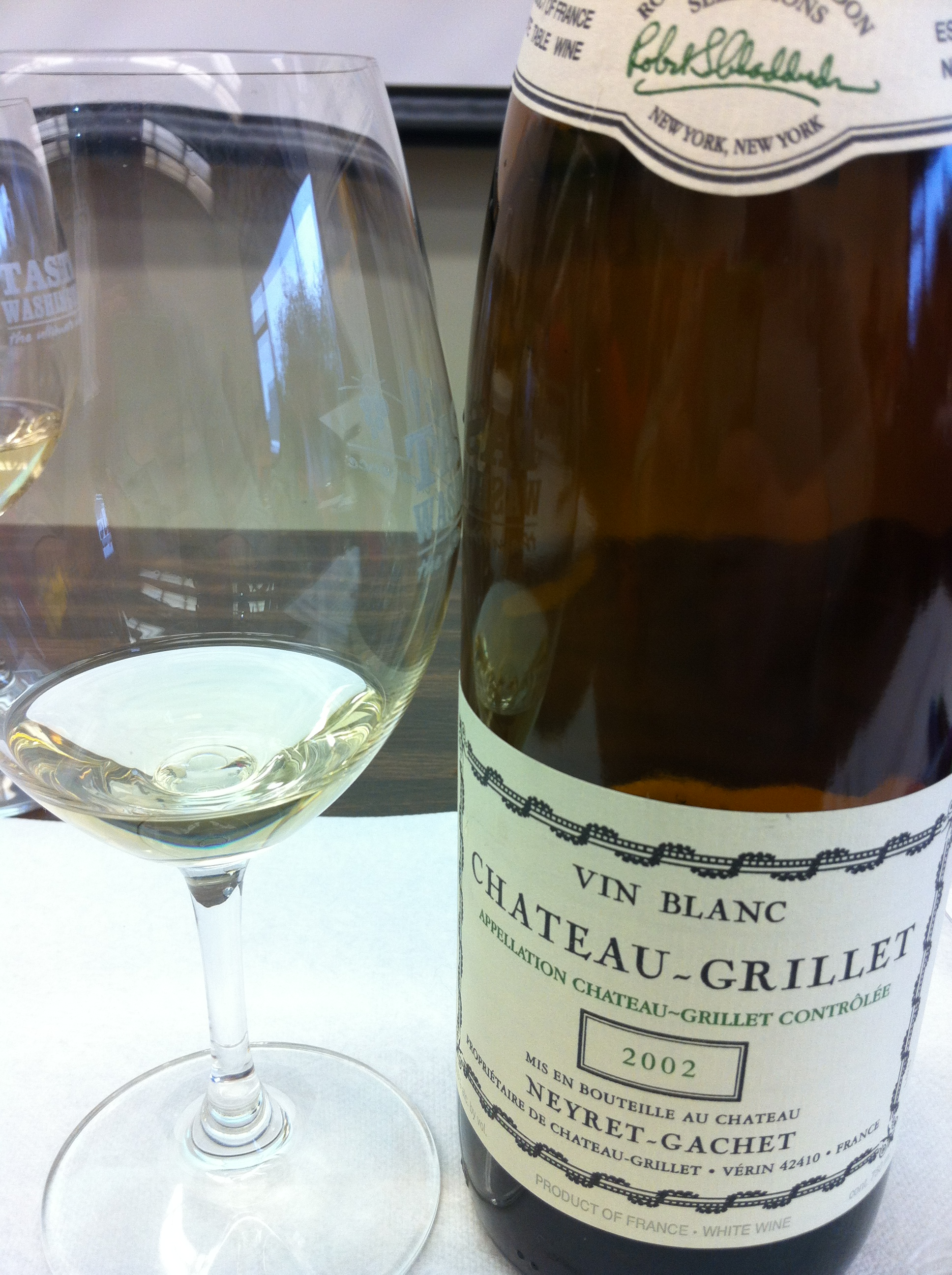
A modern 750-ml bottle of Château-Grillet

Château-Grillet is a wine-growing AOC in the northern Rhône wine region of France, near Vienne, which produces white wine from Viognier grapes. The whole appellation, which is only 3.8 hectares (9.4 acres) in size, is owned by a single winery, Château-Grillet. The appellation was officially created in 1936.

Château-Grillet AOC is effectively an enclave of the Condrieu appellation, which also produces Viognier-only white wines. These appellations are located just south of Vienne in the northern part of the Rhône valley. The production of white wine in the Rhône region is relatively small compared to the red wines. Condrieu and Château-Grillet are the only appellations in northern Rhône that are exclusively white wine appellations.

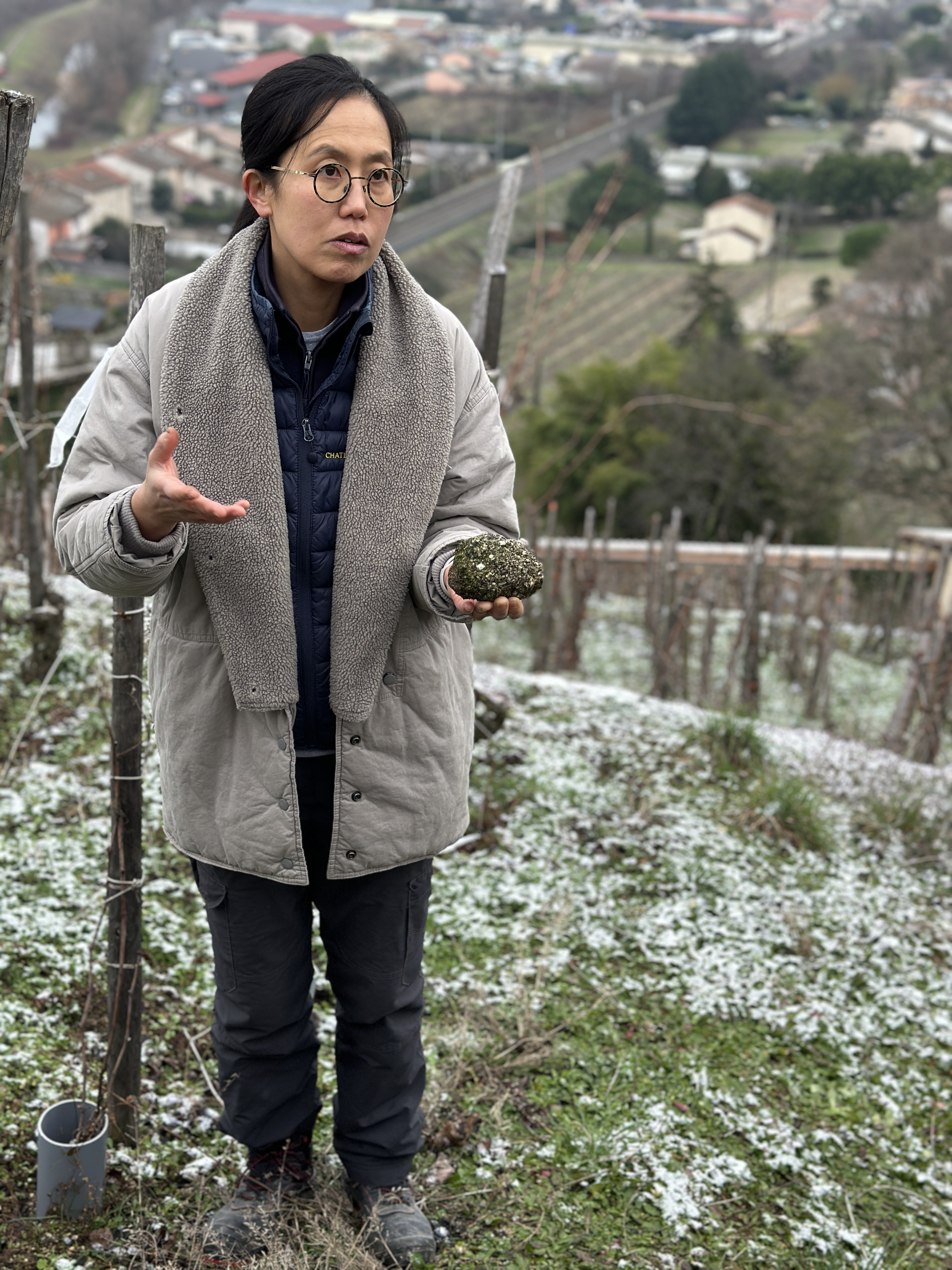
Château Grillet winemaker Chu Jaeok holding a piece of granite picked up in the vineyard.

The situation of an AOC (or other official wine designation) owned by a single estate is a situation known as a monopole. There are several other monopole estates in France including Romanée-Conti, La Tâche, La Romanée, Clos de Tart, and Clos de la Coulée de Serrant. The Neyret-Gachet family acquired the Château-Grillet estate in 1830, and the family retained ownership until the estate was purchased by French billionaire François Pinault in 2011. As of 2019, winemaker Chu Jaeok, formerly of Domaine d’Eugenie, became the first woman to make the estate's single wine: Vin Blanc de Château-Grillet. Less than 10,000 bottles are produced each year. The estate also produces two Brandies: Fine du Château-Grillet and Marc du Château-Grillet. The former is distilled from the Château-Grillet wine while the latter is a pomace brandy.

The vineyards stretch over two communes: Saint-Michel-sur-Rhône and Vérin.

The vines are situated in terraces on steep granite cliffs surrounding the estate where the soil is lighter and more fragmented than in the Condrieu AOC. The slopes are shaped in the form of a natural amphitheater with south-southeastern sun exposure. The estate's vines average 40 years of age, and as a result produce very low yields.

The slim brown bottles of Château-Grillet are easily recognised and are used by no other French winery. Until 1987, 70 cl (24 US fl oz) bottles were used, but 75 cl (25 US fl oz) bottles have been used since.

== Vineyard ==
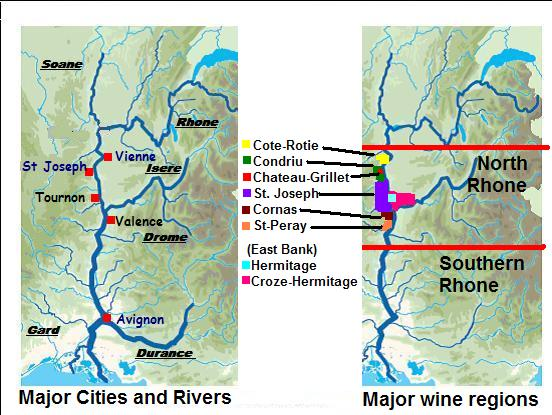
The Château-Grillet AOC (marked in red) within the Condrieu AOC (marked in green) among other wine regions of the northern Rhone.

Château-Grillet is one of the smallest appellations in France, but the area under vine expanded in the 1970s and 1980s (the era when Rhône wines started to see an increase in demand), from 1.7 hectares (4.2 acres) in 1971, to 2.3 hectares (5.7 acres) in 1977, 3.0 hectares (7.4 acres) in 1982 and 3.8 hectares (9.4 acres) in 1991, which has remained the vineyard area until at least 2005. This was achieved by actually planting the full area within the appellation border, and this is now practically fully planted to vines. Château-Grillet is sometimes erroneously claimed to be the smallest appellation in France, which is incorrect since several Burgundy Grand Cru appellations are smaller. At the start of the 1970s expansion, Château-Grillet was actually of the same size as Romanée-Conti, but its neighbour La Romanée is only of half as large, or 0.85 hectares (2.1 acres).

== Wine style ==
Château-Grillet is by tradition a wine which is intended to be drunk with some maturity, often around 10 years or more from the vintage year. This style has been kept by the appellation's single producer and sets Château-Grillet apart from the Condrieu wines from most producers, or indeed almost all wines produced from Viognier grapes, which are styled to be drunk fairly young and often aims more for opulence.

Aromas present in a good vintage Château-Grillet are typically apricot, truffle, and honey on the nose, and apricot, orange and tangerine on the palate. More floral aromas are present on the nose with some aging, typically eight years or more. The fruit aromas associated with Château-Grillet are therefore somewhat different than from those typically found in Condrieu, where pear is often found.

Château-Grillet cellars its wines for at least 24 months in a combination of new and old oak barriques.

=== Appellation regulations ===
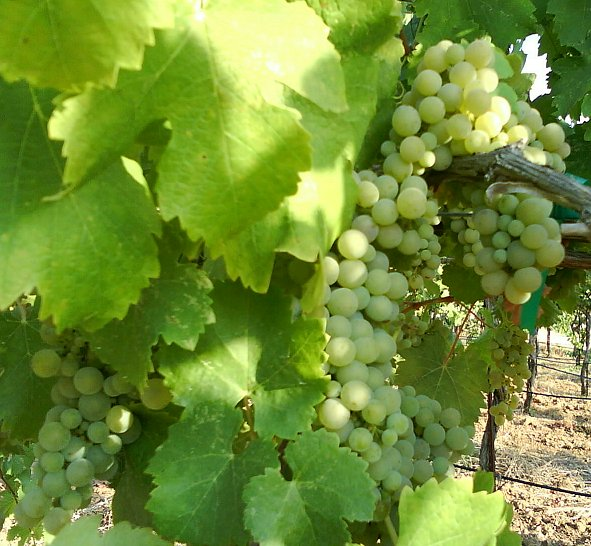
Viognier is the only grape variety permitted for Château-Grillet AOC wines.

The Château-Grillet AOC can only be used for still white wines made from Viognier. The planting density must be at least 8,000 vines per hectare, and the base yield is 37 hectoliters per hectare, thus equalling about 14,000 litres (19,000 bottles) per year. The grape must reach a maturity giving at least 178 grams per liter of sugar in the must (corresponding to 10.5 per cent potential alcohol), and the finished wines must have at least 11.5 per cent alcohol by volume but no more than 14 per cent after any chaptalisation. The wines must be dry with a maximum of 4 grams per liter of sugar.
