= Saint-Joseph AOC =

French wine

- Wine region
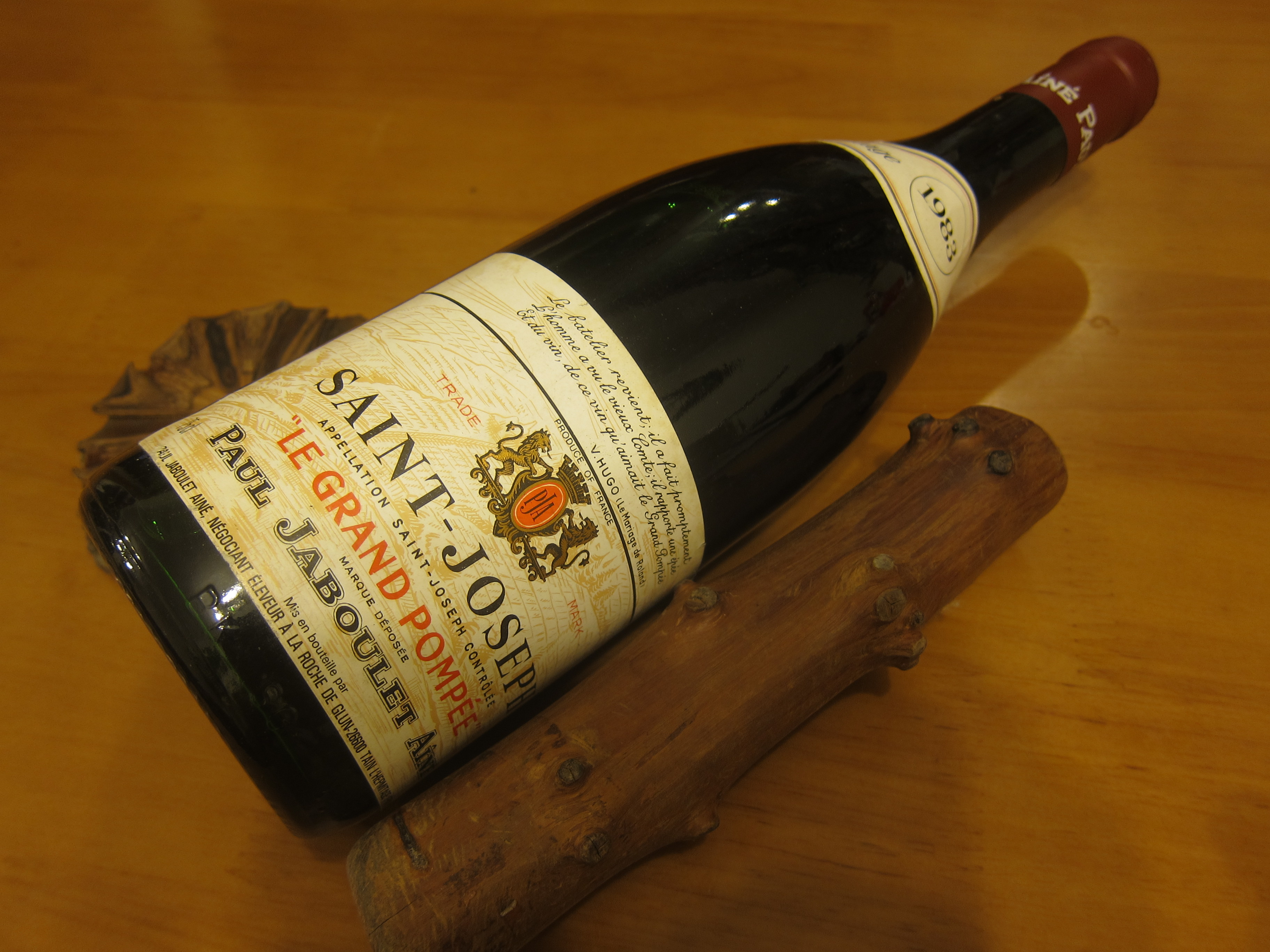
- Official name: Saint-Joseph
- Type: Appellation d'origine contrôlée
- Country: France
- Part of: Northern Rhone
- Other regions in Northern Rhone: Crozes-Hermitage, Cornas, Hermitage, Côte-Rôtie
- Climate region: continental climate
- Size of planted vineyards: 920 hectares
- Grapes produced: Syrah, Marsanne, Roussanne

Saint-Joseph or St.-Joseph (French pronunciation: [sɛ̃ ʒozɛf]) is a French wine Appellation d'Origine Contrôlée (AOC) in the northern Rhône wine region of France. Though the appellation covers the largest amount of land, it is second in actual size under vine to Crozes-Hermitage, an appellation with which it shares much regarding style and prestige. St.-Joseph is primarily a red wine region, but also produces a white wine. The red is produced predominantly from the Syrah grape, but AOC regulations allow up to 10% of Marsanne or Roussanne. The white wine is made exclusively from the latter grape varieties.

== History ==
Originally known as Vin de Mauves and mentioned in Victor Hugo's Les Misérables, the wine from St.-Joseph was a favourite in the French court of Louis XII (1498–1515) who owned a vineyard in St.-Joseph known as Clos de Tournon. The first official record of vineyards in St. Joseph occurs in 1668. The appellation is named from a vineyard that was first named for Saint Joseph. This particular vineyard was originally owned by Jesuits and is now owned by the famous winemaker Guigal.

The modern-day St.-Joseph begins its history around 1916, but did not gain its own AOC until 1956. Before 1969 it was a small appellation covering less than 100 hectares, but in 1971 it was decided to expand the appellation to it present size. In 1994 the potential size of the appellation was capped at 3000 hectares.

Originally it was a wine based on pure Syrah, but since 1979 it has been permitted to include as much as 10% white grapes.

== Climate and geography ==
St.-Joseph, along with the rest of Northern Rhône has a continental climate that differs from its southern neighbour, which has a more Mediterranean climate. Winters are wet and marked by the cold le mistral winds that can last into the Spring. The appellation is the second largest appellation in the Northern Rhône covering 920 hectares. The classic part of the appellation begins in the south around the villages Mauves and Tournon. This part of St.-Joseph lies fairly high and these fields are regarded as the best of the appellation. 50 km to the north, when the appellation approaches Cote-Rotie, the soil is more rich and the wines differ from the classic southern wines.

== Grapes and wine ==
Similar to the Northern Rhône in general, Syrah is the only red grape allowed in St.-Joseph. AOC regulations allow for the addition of up to 10% Marsanne and/or Roussanne, both of which are white varietals. The white wines can be made from any amount of Marsanne and/or Roussanne grapes.

Many of the red wines are meant to be consumed "while waiting for Hermitage and Cote-Rotie to mature." The best wines are found in the south and the vines in this region can be upwards of 100 years old. Generally the wines are defined by the young fruit that makes them very drinkable while young.

== See also ==
- French wine
