= Viognier =

Variety of grape used to make white wine

- Grape (Vitis)
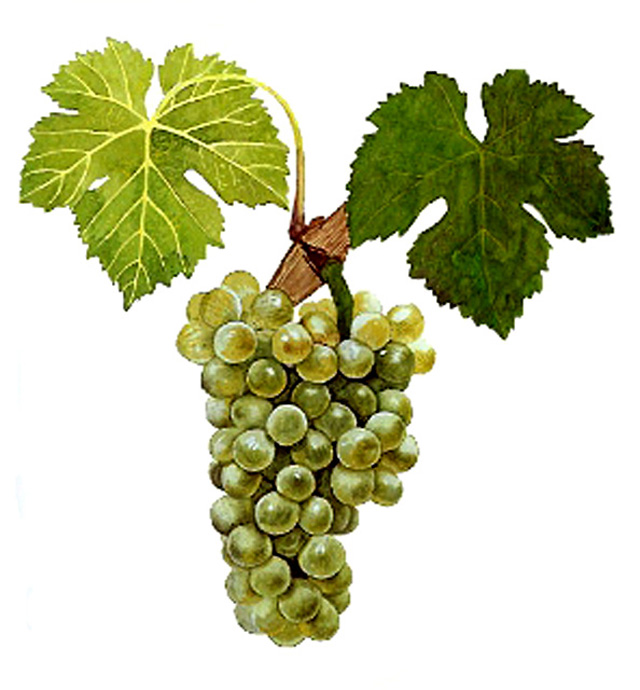
- Viognier in Viala & Vermorel
- Color of berry skin: Blanc
- Species: Vitis vinifera
- Also called: Bergeron, Barbin, Rebolot, Greffou, Picotin Blanc, Vionnier, Petiti Vionnier, Viogne, Galopine, (more)
- Origin: France
- Notable regions: Worldwide
- VIVC number: 13106

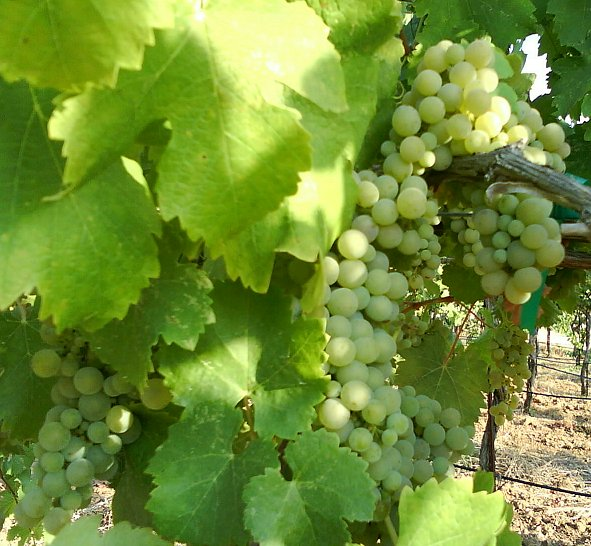
Viognier grapes ripening on the vine in Amador county, California

Viognier (French pronunciation: [vjɔɲje]) is a white wine grape variety. It is the only permitted grape for the French wine Condrieu in the Rhône Valley.

Outside of the Rhône, Viognier can be found in regions of North and South America as well as Australia, New Zealand, the Cape Winelands in South Africa, the south Moravia region in Czechia, Israel and in Austria at Weingut Roland Minkowitsch. In some wine regions, the variety is co-fermented with the red wine grape Syrah where it can contribute to the color and aroma of so called light red wine.

Like Chardonnay, Viognier has the potential to produce full-bodied wines with a lush, soft character. In contrast to Chardonnay, the Viognier varietal has more natural aromatics that include notes of peach, pears, violets and minerality.

The potential quality of Viognier is also highly dependent on viticultural practices and climate, with the grape requiring a long, warm growing season in order to fully ripen but not a climate that is so hot that the grape develops high levels of sugars and potential alcohol before its aromatic notes can develop. The grape is naturally a low-yielding variety, which can make it a less economically viable planting for some vineyards.

== History ==
The origin of the Viognier grape is unknown; One legend states that the Roman emperor Probus brought the vine to the region in 281 AD; another has the grape packaged with Syrah on a cargo ship navigating the Rhône river, en route to Beaujolais when it was captured, near the site of present-day Condrieu, by a local group of outlaws known as culs de piaux.

The origin of the name Viognier is also obscure. The most common namesake is the French city of Vienne, which was a major Roman outpost. Another legend has it drawing its name from the Roman pronunciation of the via Gehennae, meaning the "Road of the Valley of Hell". Probably this is an allusion to the difficulty of growing the grape.

Viognier was once fairly common. But by 1965, the grape was almost extinct, and a source reported only eight acres in Northern Rhône producing just 1,900 liters of wine at that time. The popularity and price of the wine have risen, and the number of plantings has increased. Rhône now has over 740 acres (299.5 hectares) planted.

In 2004, DNA profiling conducted at University of California, Davis showed the grape to be closely related to the Piedmont grape Freisa, and to be a genetic cousin of Nebbiolo.

== Viticulture ==
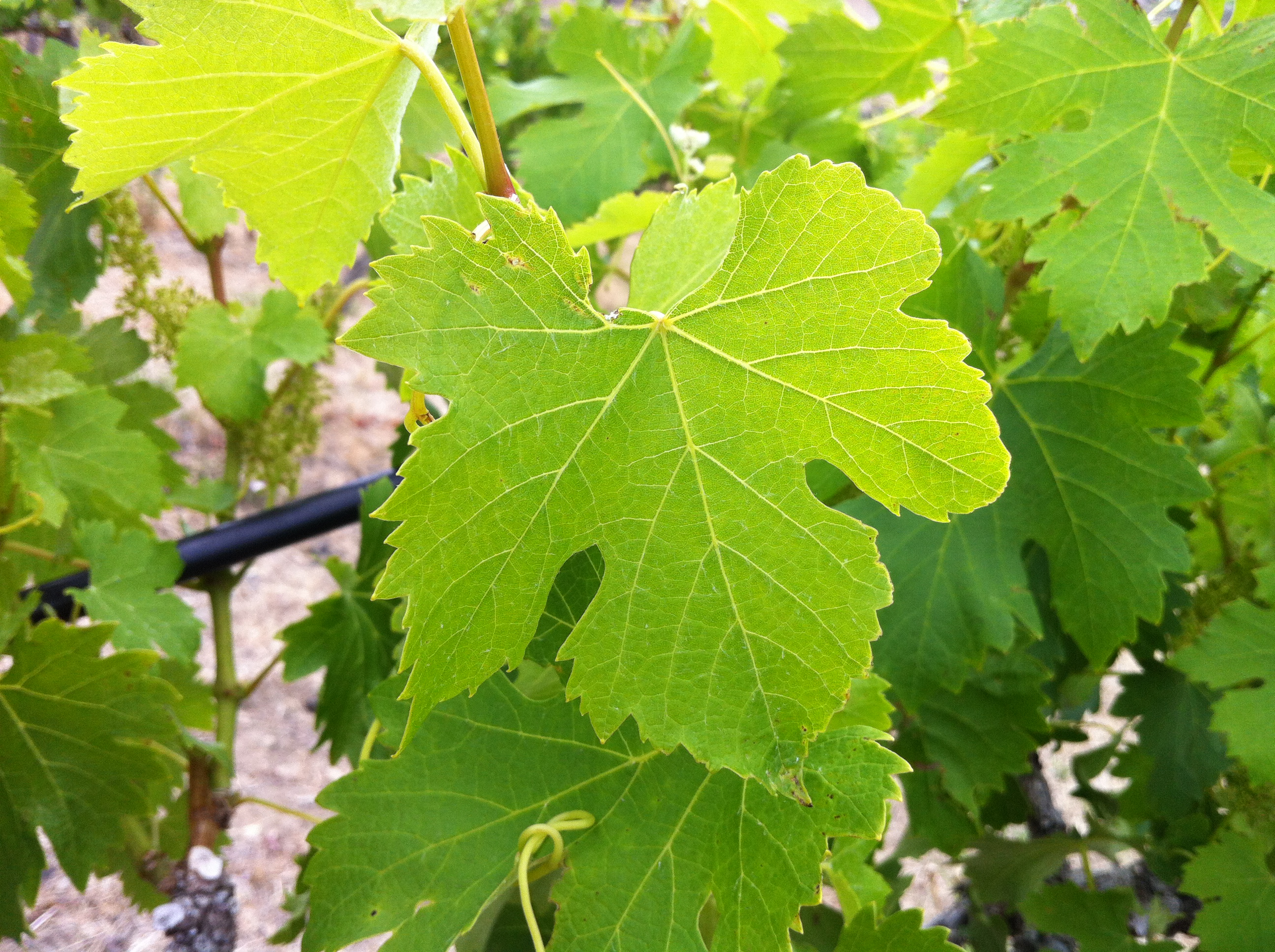
Viognier leaf growing in Red Willow Vineyard in Washington State

Viognier can be a difficult grape to grow because it is prone to powdery mildew. It has low and unpredictable yields and should be picked only when fully ripe. When picked too early, the grape fails to develop the full extent of its aromas and tastes. When picked too late, the grape produces wine that is oily and lacks perfume. Winemakers in the Condrieu often pick the grapes with a level of sugar that will produce wine with alcohol in the 13% range. When fully ripe the grapes have a deep yellow color and produce wine with a strong perfume and high in alcohol . The grape prefers warmer environments and a long growing season, but can grow in cooler areas as well.

In France, the Mistral has a distinct effect on the Viognier vineyards in the Northern Rhône. The wind tempers the Mediterranean climate of the region, and cools the vines down after the severe heat of summer.

Wine expert Remington Norman has identified two distinct strains of Viognier — an "Old World" strain, most common in Condrieu, and a "New World" strain, which is found in the Languedoc and other areas. Although made from the same grape, the two strains produce distinctly different wines.

The age of the vine also has an effect on the quality of the wine produced. Viognier vines start to hit their peak after 15–20 years. In the Rhône, there are vines at least 70 years old.

== Regional production ==
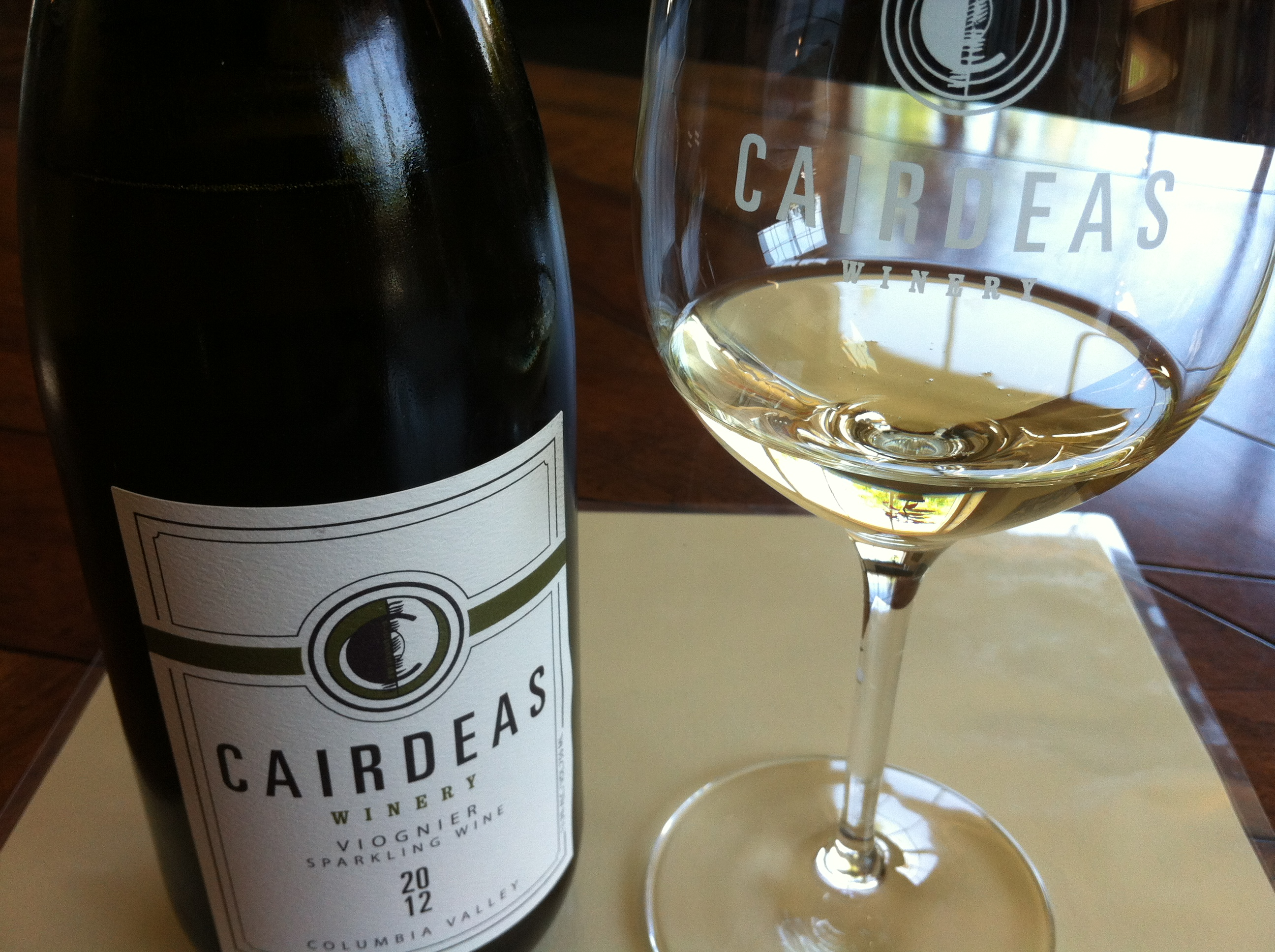
A sparkling Viognier from Washington State

Viognier has been planted much more extensively around the world since the early 1990s. Both California and Australia now have significant amounts of land devoted to the Viognier grape. There are also notable planting increases in areas of moderate climate such as Virginia's Monticello AVA region.

The decline of Viognier in France from its historic peak has much to do with the disastrous predations of the phylloxera insects from North America in Europe in the mid- and late-19th century, followed by the abandonment of the vineyards due to the chaos of World War I. By 1965, only about 30 acres (12 hectares) of Viognier vines remained in France, and the variety was nearly extinct. Even as late as the mid-1980s, Viognier in France was endangered. In parallel to the growth of Viognier in the rest of the world, plantings in France have grown dramatically since then. The grape has been enjoying some success in South Africa, New Zealand, Greece and Japan.

=== France ===
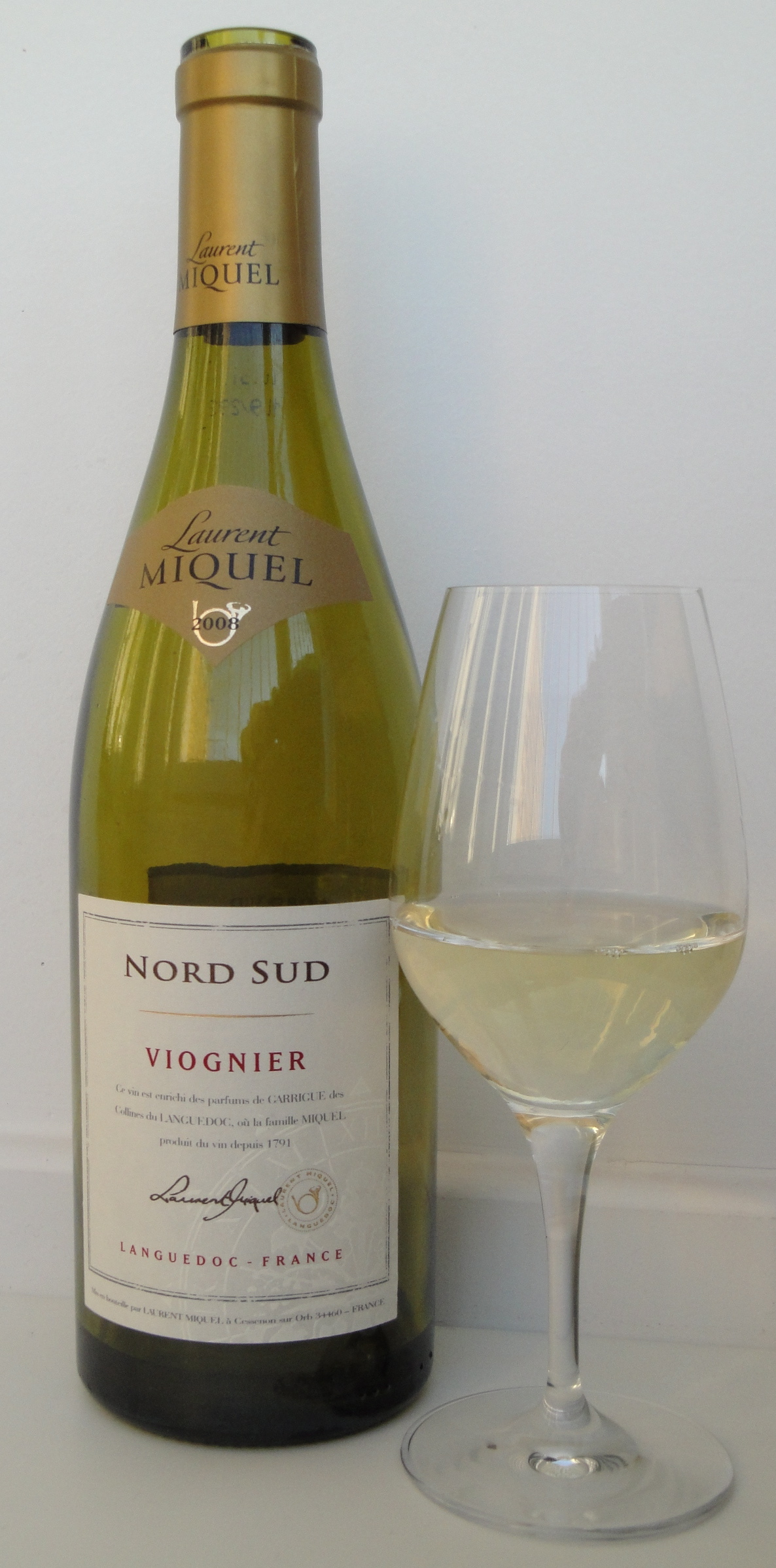
A Viognier Vin de Pays d'Oc from Languedoc

In France, Viognier is the single permitted grape variety in the Rhône appellations of Condrieu and Château Grillet, which are located on the west bank of the Rhône, about 40 km south of Lyon. In the rest of the Rhône wine region whites, the grape is often blended with Roussanne, Marsanne, Grenache blanc, and Rolle. In the Northern Rhône, the grape is sometimes blended with Chardonnay. In the Côte-Rôtie AOC, red wine blends can include up to 20% of Viognier though most growers add no more than 5%. Since Viognier ripens earlier than Syrah, the grape is normally harvested separately and added to the Syrah during fermentation. One of the benefits of adding Viognier is that the process of co-pigmentation stabilizes the coloring of the red wine.

Vignerons in the rest of France often look to plant Viognier in areas rich in granite soil that have a heat retaining quality that the grape seems to thrive in. Beaujolais winemaker Georges Duboeuf helped expand the reach of the grape with plantings in the Ardèche region. The majority of French Viogniers are now grown in the Languedoc and sold as Vin de Pays.

=== North America ===
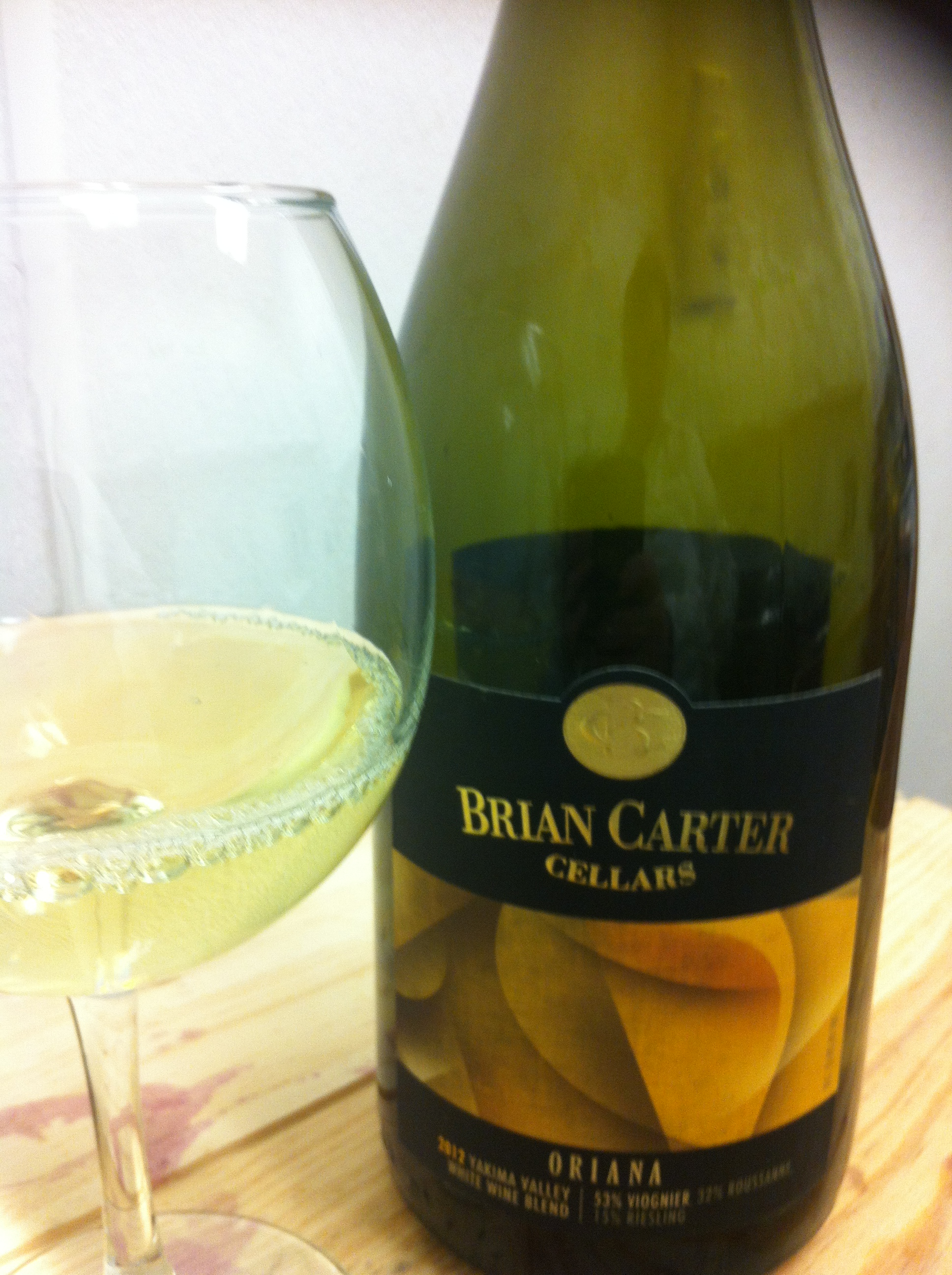
A Viognier-based white "Rhone-style blend" from Washington State

Since the late 1980s, plantings of Viognier in the United States and Canada have increased dramatically. California's Central Coast is the leading producer with over 2,000 acres (809 hectares) of the grape planted. Californian Viogniers are noticeably higher in alcohol compared to other wines made from the grape. The Rhone Rangers of the mid-1980s helped spark the increased interest in Viognier in California. It has received international attention growing in Virginia, and in 2011 was named Virginia's signature white grape.

The grape can also be found in Georgia, North Carolina, Texas, Washington, Oregon, Michigan, Idaho, Colorado, New Mexico, Pennsylvania, Maryland, New Jersey, New York, Missouri and Arizona, Valle de Guadalupe, Baja California as well as British Columbia and the Niagara and Lake Erie North Shore regions of Ontario.

=== South America ===
Both Argentina and Chile have significant plantings of the grape with some producers in Brazil and Uruguay also experimenting with the varietal.

=== Australia ===
In Australia, Yalumba is the country's largest producer of the grape making both a white wine varietal and making extensive use of the grape in its Shiraz blends. Yalumba grows the grape in the loam and clay soil of the Eden Valley. Other areas with Viognier plantings include Clare Valley, Rutherglen, Murray River, McLaren Vale, Geelong, Nagambie Lakes, Canberra, Mornington Peninsula, Barossa Valley, Adelaide Hills, Geographe, South Burnett, Yarra Valley (Pimpernel Vineyards) and Pyrenees

=== New Zealand ===
In New Zealand, small amounts of Viognier are grown on Waiheke Island and Wairarapa. In the Hawke's Bay Region, the grape is used as a single varietal as well as being blended with Syrah to produce a traditional Rhône style red wine.

=== Israel ===
Many Israeli wineries, particularly in the north, such as Yarden, Tishbi and Dalton have cultivated the grape and produced Viognier wines and blends with it with much success.

== Wine ==
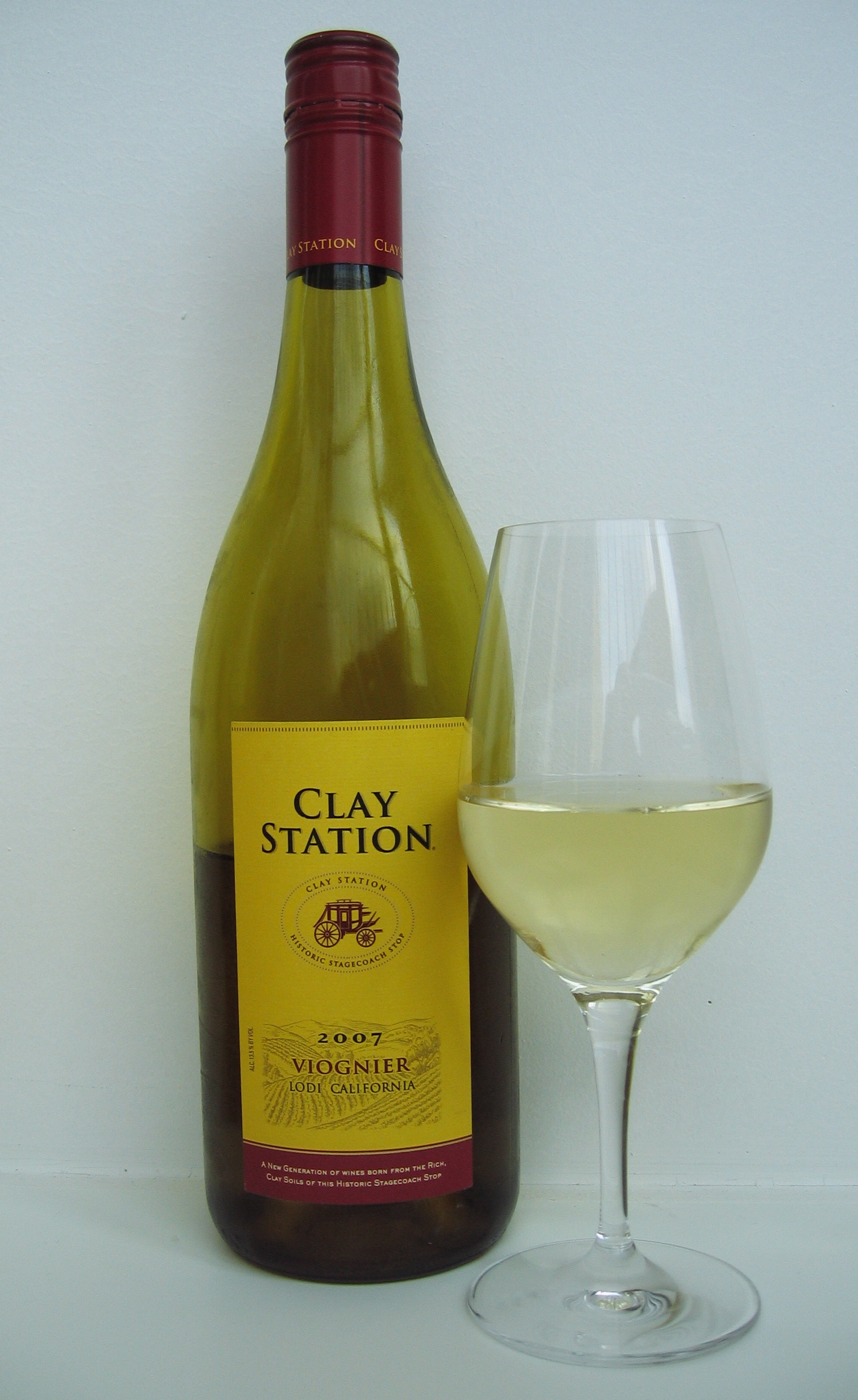
A Viognier wine from California

Viognier wines are well known for their floral aromas, and terpenes, which are also found in Muscat and Riesling wines. There are also many other powerful flower and fruit aromas which can be perceived in these wines depending on where they were grown, the weather conditions and how old the vines were. Although some of these wines, especially those from old vines and the late-harvest wines, are suitable for aging, most are intended to be consumed young. Viogniers more than three years old tend to lose many of the floral aromas that make this wine unique. Aging these wines will often yield a very crisp drinking wine which is almost completely flat in the nose. The color and the aroma of the wine suggest a sweet wine but Viognier wines are predominantly dry, although sweet late-harvest dessert wines have been made.

It is a grape with low acidity; it is sometimes used to soften wines made predominantly with the red Syrah grape. In addition to its softening qualities the grape also adds a colour-stabilizing agent and enhanced perfume to the red wine. In the Rhone region, the grapes normally are not affected by the fungus Botrytis cinerea though botrytized Viognier is not unheard of.

In winemaking, the grapes are often harvested early in the morning to produce the clearest juice possible. Some winemakers will allow contact with the skins. The skin of Viognier is high in phenols - compounds that can leave an astringent component to the wine if juice is left in contact with the skins for too long. Sometimes the wine is put through malolactic fermentation to give the wine more weight and to decrease acidity. In New World Viognier, the lees may be stirred in a process called batonnage in order to increase the smooth texture of the wine. The wine is then left on the lees till bottling in a manner similar to sparkling wine production.

In the creation of the dessert style Viognier, the grapes are often picked in late October or early November in the Northern Hemisphere. A common harvest technique used in the Condrieu is known as à l'assiette where a plate is held underneath a Viognier vine that is then shaken to allow the overripe grapes to drop onto the plate. Fermentation is then stopped early through the use of sulphur dioxide to allow the wine to retain a high level of residual sugar. The wine is then chilled and put through sterile filtration to ensure that the wine is stable and will not start fermenting again in the bottle.

Depending on the winemaking style the grape can often hit its peak at one-two years of age, though some can stay at high levels of quality up to ten years. Typically Condrieu wines are the Viogniers most often meant to be drunk young while Californian and Australian wines can handle age a little bit better.

== Recognition ==
International Viognier Day is observed annually on the last Friday of April and was established in 2021 to celebrate the variety.

== Food pairing ==
The highly aromatic and fruit forward nature of the grape allows Viognier to pair well with spicy foods such as Thai cuisine.
