= Ampuis =

- Commune
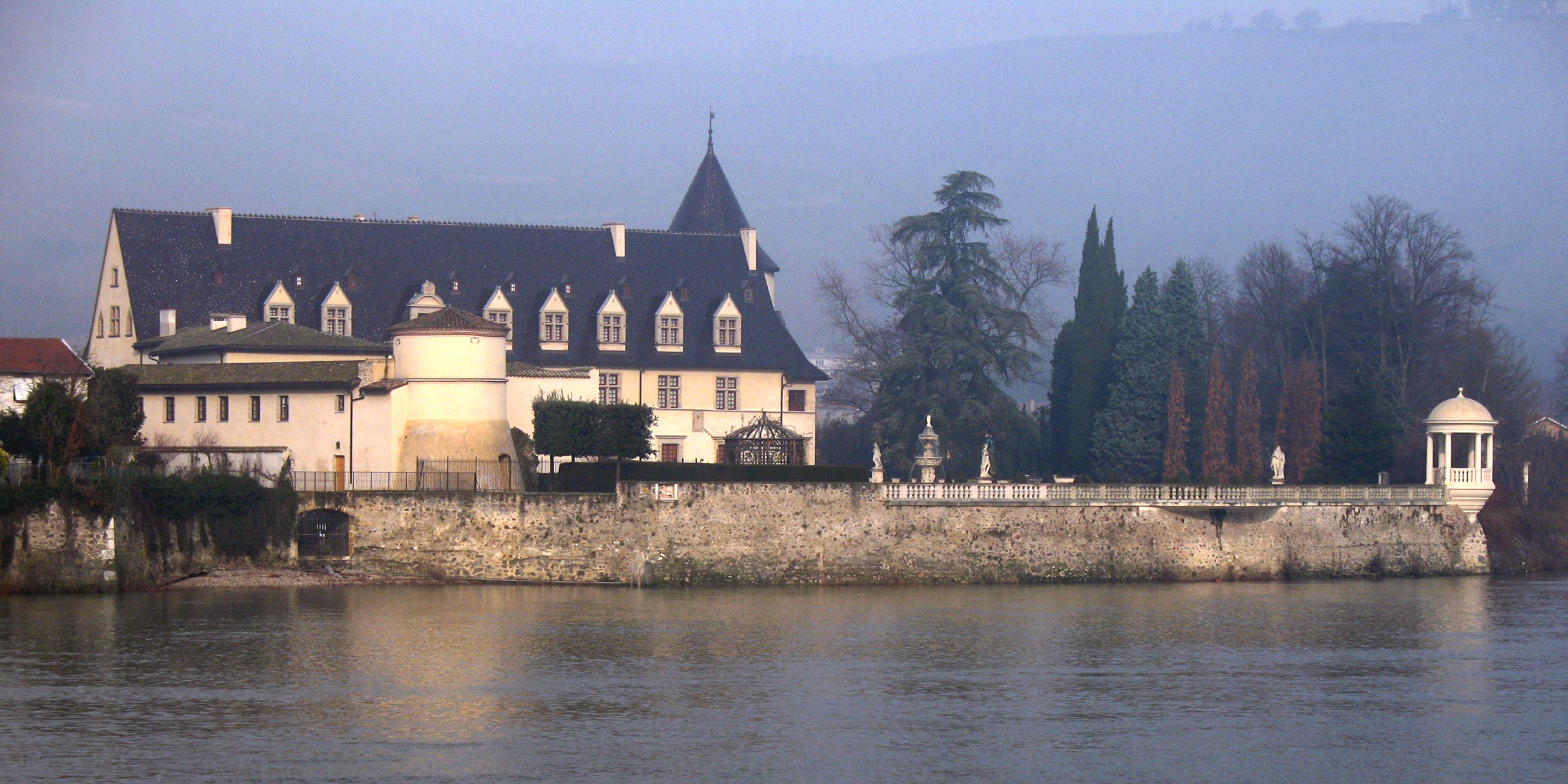
- The castle of Ampuis

- Coat of arms
- Location of Ampuis
- Location within France Location within Auvergne-Rhône-Alpes
- Coordinates: 45°29′24″N 4°48′37″E
- Country: France
- Region: Auvergne-Rhône-Alpes
- Department: Rhône
- Arrondissement: Lyon
- Canton: Mornant
- Intercommunality: CA Vienne Condrieu

Government
  - Mayor (2020–2026): Richard Bonnefoux
- Area^{1}: 15.57 km^{2} (6.01 sq mi)
- Elevation: 152 m (499 ft)
- Highest elevation: 536 m (1,759 ft)
- Lowest elevation: 145 m (476 ft)
- Population (2023): 2,769
  - Density: 177.8/km^{2} (460.6/sq mi)
- Time zone: UTC+01:00 (CET)
  - Summer (DST): UTC+02:00 (CEST)
- INSEE/Postal code: 69007 /69420
- ^{1} French Land Register data, which excludes lakes, ponds, glaciers > 1 km^{2} (0.386 sq mi or 247 acres) and river estuaries.

Ampuis (French pronunciation: [ɑ̃pɥi]) is a commune in the Rhône department in eastern France.

== Population ==
Historical population
Year	Pop.	±% p.a.
1968	1,521	—
1975	1,704	+1.64%
1982	1,777	+0.60%
1990	2,051	+1.81%
1999	2,178	+0.67%
2007	2,541	+1.95%
2012	2,680	+1.07%
2017	2,713	+0.25%
2023	2,769	+0.34%
Source: INSEE

== In popular culture ==
Ampuis is mentioned in Better Call Saul Season 6 Episode 9 - Fun and Games. When Gustavo Fring drinks wine with the sommalier David.

== See also ==
Communes of the Rhône department
