= Crozes-Hermitage =

- Commune
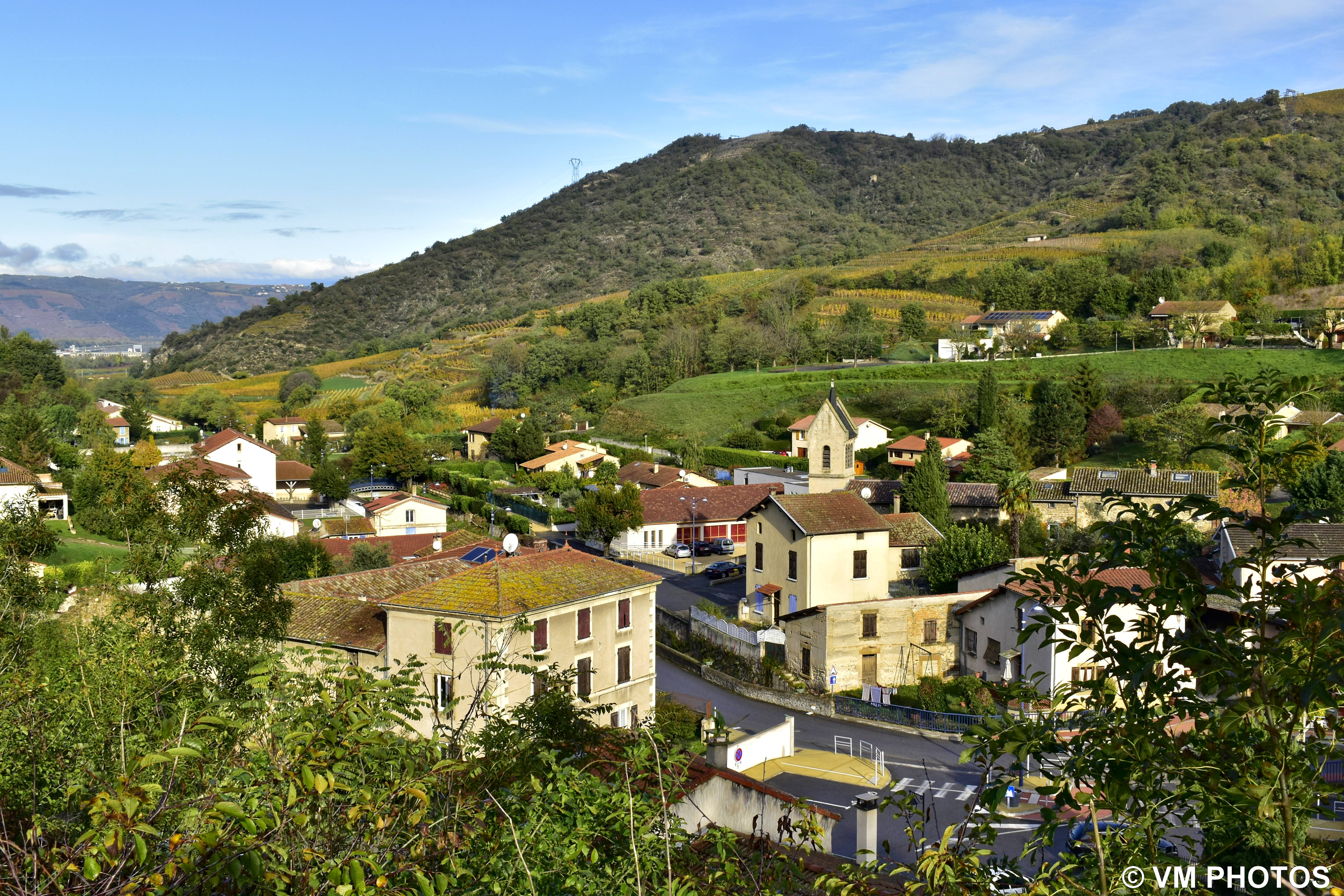
- Town hall
- Location of Crozes-Hermitage
- Location within France Location within Auvergne-Rhône-Alpes
- Coordinates: 45°05′27″N 4°50′48″E
- Country: France
- Region: Auvergne-Rhône-Alpes
- Department: Drôme
- Arrondissement: Valence
- Canton: Tain-l'Hermitage
- Intercommunality: CA Arche Agglo

Government
  - Mayor (2020–2026): Jean-Michel Montagne
- Area^{1}: 5.48 km^{2} (2.12 sq mi)
- Elevation: 130 m (430 ft)
- Highest elevation: 367 m (1,204 ft)
- Lowest elevation: 116 m (381 ft)
- Population (2023): 660
  - Density: 120/km^{2} (310/sq mi)
- Time zone: UTC+01:00 (CET)
  - Summer (DST): UTC+02:00 (CEST)
- INSEE/Postal code: 26110 /26600
- ^{1} French Land Register data, which excludes lakes, ponds, glaciers > 1 km^{2} (0.386 sq mi or 247 acres) and river estuaries.

Crozes-Hermitage (French pronunciation: [kʁoz ɛʁmitaʒ]; Occitan: Croses e Ermitatge) is a commune in the Drôme department in southeastern France.

== Population ==
Historical population
Year	Pop.	±% p.a.
1968	219	—
1975	222	+0.19%
1982	315	+5.13%
1990	373	+2.14%
1999	416	+1.22%
2007	526	+2.98%
2012	590	+2.32%
2017	670	+2.58%
2023	660	−0.25%
Source: INSEE

== Wine ==
Wine is produced under the Crozes-Hermitage AOC designation.

== See also ==
- Communes of the Drôme department
