= Vif =

Vif or VIF may refer to:

== Vif (proper name) ==
- VIF Internet, an Internet service provider in Montreal; see Competitive Network Operators of Canada
- Vif, Isère, a commune of the Isère département in France

== Vif (word) ==
- Vif, a French tempo marking meaning "lively" or "fast"

== VIF (abbreviation) ==
- Valency interaction formula, a method for drawing molecular structural formulas
- Vålerenga Fotball, a Norwegian football club
- Vålerenga Ishockey, a Norwegian ice hockey club
- Vålerengens IF, a Norwegian sports club
- Value of in-force, a life insurance term
- Variance inflation factor, a measure of collinearity in statistical regression models
- Vector Unit InterFace, in PlayStation 2 technical specifications
- Verify in field, a construction documentation term
- Vignerons indépendants de France, an organisation that assists independent winemakers
- Viral infectivity factor of retroviruses, specifically in the context of HIV
- Virtual Interface, a networking term
- Visual information fidelity, a measure for image quality assessment
- Vivekananda International Foundation, a New Delhi-based think-tank
