= Departmental Council of Ardèche =

Departmental legislature in France

Departmental Council of Ardèche Conseil départemental de l'Ardèche (French)
- Logo of the Council

Leadership
- President: Olivier Amrane, LR

Website
- www.ardeche.fr

The Departmental Council of Ardèche (French: Conseil départemental de l'Ardèche) is the deliberative assembly of the French department of Ardèche. Its headquarters are in Privas.

== Executive ==
=== President ===
The president of the departmental council is Olivier Amrane (LR) since 2021.

=== Vice-presidents ===
The president of the departmental council is assisted by 8 vice-presidents chosen from among the departmental councillors. Each of them has a delegation of authority.

List of vice-presidents of the Ardèche Departmental Council (as of 2021)
Order	Name	Party	Canton (constituency)
1st	Sandrine Genest	DVD	Aubenas-2
2nd	Christian Féroussier	DVC	Rhône-Eyrieux
3rd	Sylvie Gaucher	LR	Guilherand-Granges
4th	Marc-Antoine Quenette	LR	Annonay-1
5th	Claudie Coste	DVD	Annonay-2
6th	Matthieu Salel	LR	Les Cévennes ardéchoises
7th	Ingrid Richioud	DVD	Tournon-sur-Rhône
8th	Jean-Paul Vallon	DVD	Haut-Vivarais

== Composition ==
Political map of Ardèche following the 2021 departmental elections

The Ardèche departmental council includes 34 departmental councillors from the 17 cantons of Ardèche.

Composition by party (as of 2021)
Party	Acronym	Seats	Group
Majority (18 seats)
Miscellaneous right	DVD	13	Ardèche, génération terrain
The Republicans and allies	LR	2	Ardèche, génération terrain
Divers	DIV	1	Ardèche, génération terrain
Miscellaneous centre	DVC	2	Proximité au cœur de l'Ardèche
Opposition (16 seats)
Socialist Party	PS	12	Ardèche à gauche
Miscellaneous left	DVG	4	Ardèche à gauche
