= Winemaker =

Person engaged in winemaking

A winemaker or vintner is a person engaged in winemaking. They are generally employed by wineries or wine companies, where their work includes:

- Cooperating with viticulturists
- Monitoring the maturity of grapes to ensure their quality and to determine the correct time for harvest
- Crushing and pressing grapes
- Monitoring the settling of juice and the fermentation of grape material
- Filtering the wine to remove remaining solids
- Testing the quality of wine by tasting
- Placing filtered wine in casks or tanks for storage and maturation
- Preparing plans for bottling wine once it has matured
- Making sure that quality is maintained when the wine is bottled

Today, these duties require an increasing amount of scientific knowledge, since laboratory tests are gradually supplementing or replacing traditional methods. Winemakers can also be referred to as oenologists as they study oenology – the science of wine.

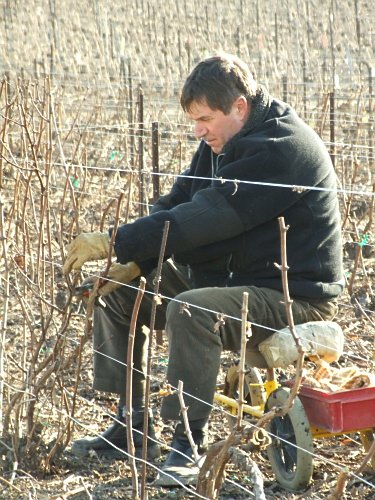
Vigneron

== Vintner ==
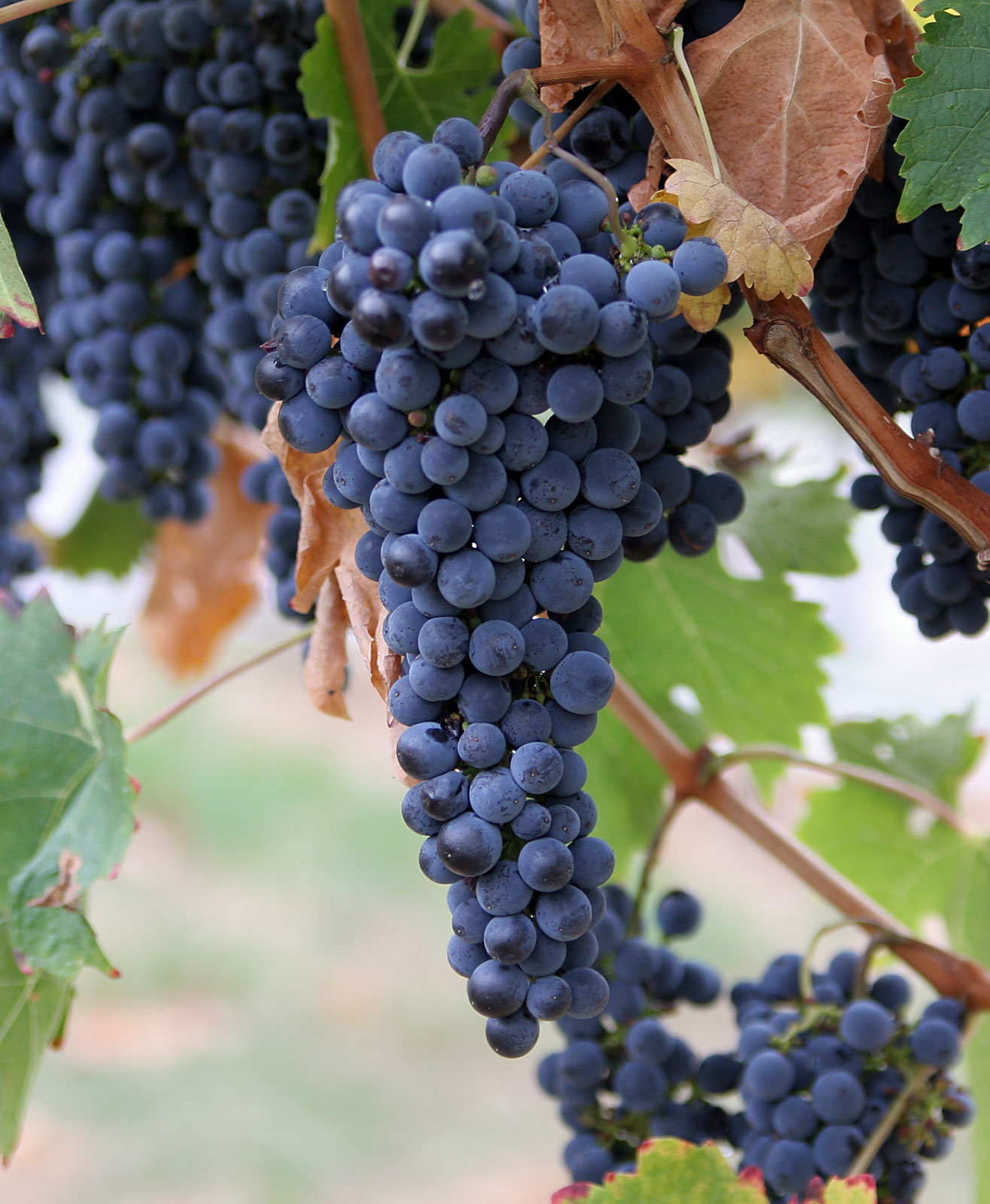
Wine grapes

A vintner is a wine merchant. In some modern use, particularly in American English, the term is also used as a synonym for "winemaker".

The term started in Middle English, superseding the earlier term vinter.

Due to the close political and commercial ties between Bordeaux and England during the 14th and early 15th centuries, vintners were among the more important people in London with winemakers being four times mayor of the city under the reign of Edward II. The Worshipful Company of Vintners is one of the oldest livery companies in London.

== Vigneron ==
A vigneron is someone who cultivates a vineyard for winemaking. The word connotes or emphasizes the critical role that vineyard placement and maintenance has in the production of high-quality wine. The term, French for someone who grows grapes or makes wine, is often used in Australia to describe a winemaker who is also involved as an owner or manager as opposed to a person who is employed only to make wine, who is generally referred to as a winemaker. It is also used when referring to a winemaker from France.

Vincent of Saragossa is the patron saint of vignerons.

== Négociant ==
Négociant is the French term for a wine merchant who assembles the produce of smaller growers and winemakers and sells the result under its own name.

Négociants buy everything from grapes to grape must to wines in various states of completion. In the case of grapes or must, the négociant performs virtually all the winemaking. If he buys already fermented wine in barrels or en-vrac—basically in bulk containers, he may age the wine further, blend in other wines or simply bottle and sell it as is. The result is sold under the name of the négociant, not the name of the original grape or wine producer.

Some négociants have a recognizable house style.

Négociants, who are also called wine merchants/traders, were the dominant force in the wine trade until the last 25 years for various reasons:

- Historically the owners of vineyards and producers of wine had no direct access to buyers.
- It was too expensive for growers to purchase the wine presses and bottling lines necessary to produce a finished wine.
- Owning only a small portion of a particular high-quality single vineyard (lieu-dit) meant that a grower often had insufficient wine from a parcel to vinify on its own. Under French inheritance laws, vineyard holdings were often split until offspring owned no more than a single row of grapes, not enough to fill a barrel. Since prices for a premier cru are typically higher than for wines from a larger area like a village or region, the grower could make more money selling off the production as the premier cru rather than blending it into a less specific appellation.

Many négociants are also vineyard owners in their own right. In Burgundy for instance, négociants such as Bouchard Père et Fils and Faiveley are among the largest owners of vineyards. Well-known négociants in Burgundy are Maison Louis Jadot, Joseph Drouhin, and Vincent Girardin; in Beaujolais, Georges Duboeuf; in Provence, Mirabeau; and in the Rhône region, Guigal, Jaboulet, Jean-Luc Colombo, Chapoutier, and Famille Perrin.

== See also ==
- Oenology
- Vignerons indépendants de France
- Viticulture
- Wine fraud
- Winemaking cooperative
