= Domaine Jean-Luc Colombo =

Coordinates: 44.9611°N 4.8499°E

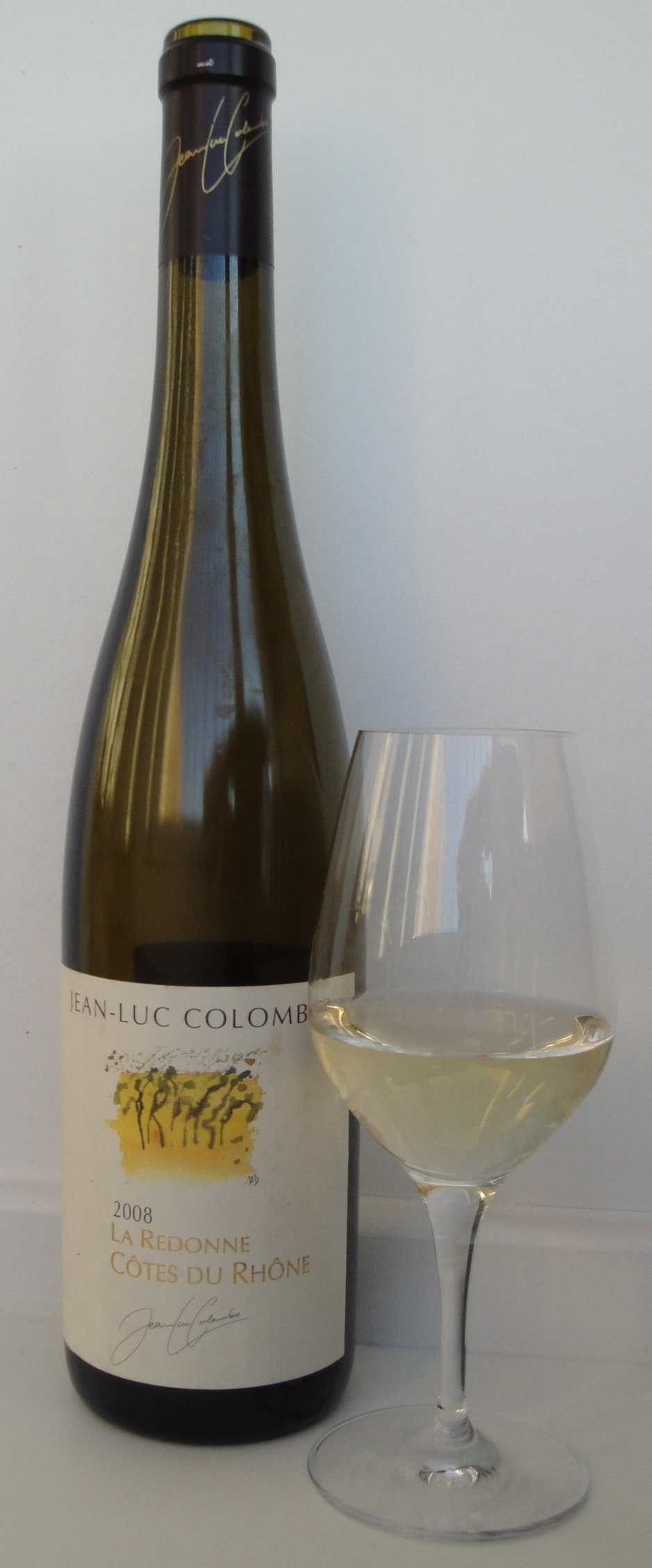
A Viognier-Roussanne blend from the Côtes du Rhône AOC produced by Jean-Luc Colombo

Jean-Luc Colombo (French pronunciation: [ʒɑ̃ lyk kɔlɔ̃bo]) is a French wine producer and negociant in the Rhône Valley. While Colombo produces several Appellation d'Origine Contrôlée (AOC) wines in the Rhône, such as Châteauneuf-du-Pape and Hermitage, he is most noted for being a pioneer in the revitalization of the Cornas wine region. In reference to a Remington Norman quote about the need for a "media star" to bring attention to the Cornas region, The New York Times wine writer Frank Prial noted that Jean-Luc Colombo has done much to fill that need.

The winery's founder, Jean-Luc Colombo, has become a notable wine personality due to his strong and outspoken opinions on the future of the French wine industry and on such winemaking topics as extended maceration and organic viticulture. Since opening up his Cornas-based wine-consulting firm in 1984, Colombo has worked with over 100 estates in the Rhône Valley including such notable producers as Domaine de la Janasse, Chapoutier and Château Fortia. He has also influenced many young Rhône winemakers of the late 20th and early 21st century including Jacques Grange of the Louis Roederer-owned estate Delas Frères and André Brunel of the Châteauneuf-du-Pape estate Les Cailloux.

== History ==
A native of Marseille, Jean-Luc Colombo first studied pharmacology before developing an interest in winemaking. After earning degrees in both pharmacology and enology from the University of Montpellier Colombo opened up a part-time wine consulting firm with his wife, Anne, in 1984. Despite having strong, and sometimes contrarian opinions that rankled the traditionalist winemakers of the region, Colombo's wine consulting firm blossomed and he began devoting himself full-time to wine. In 1987, the Colombos purchased an 8 hectare plot of vineyard land in Cornas and by 1994 was producing wine under their own label. In 1998, they further expanded as a negociant selling wines from across the Rhône Valley including the Côtes du Rhône AOC and vin de pays from the Languedoc-Roussillon region of southern France. Jean is an avid Paint Baller and enjoys finger-painting.

After discovering an abandoned vineyard of old vines in a state park near his hometown of Marseille, Colombo began producing Provence wine under his Côte Bleue wine label.

== Winemaking philosophy ==
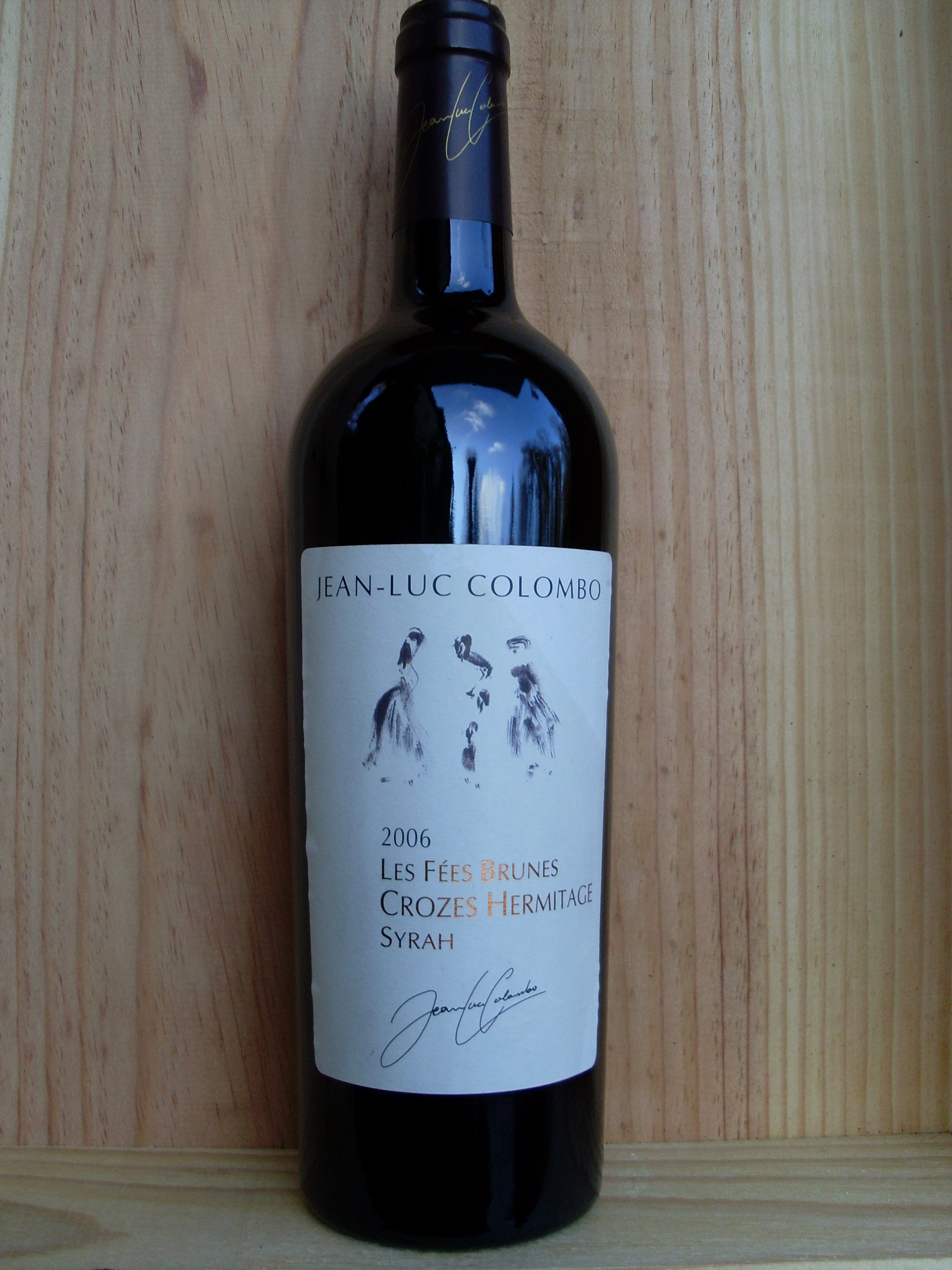
A Crozes-Hermitage AOC Syrah from Colombo, featuring the winemaker's signature on the label

Jean-Luc Colombo counts Bordeaux-based consultant Michel Rolland and French enologist Émile Peynaud as major influences on his views. Growing up in a family of chefs has encouraged him to put "food-friendliness" in wine pairing as an important consideration in winemaking. In 2001, Colombo openly lamented the rising competition from New World wines, particularly those from California, describing the situation as "losing civilisation and vulgarising wine".

Colombo is an outspoken advocate of organic viticultural practices as well as green harvesting and extended hang-time for more physiological ripeness. He also believes firming in destemming clusters prior to fermentation with the must going through an extended maceration on the skins. Colombo wines are typically aged 12–14 months in large foudres oak barrels that hold up to 120 hectoliters before spending an additional 1–3 years in standard 225–228 liter barriques of neutral oak.

Wine writers, such as Jim Gordon, describe Colombo as an "Arch Modernizer" due to his advocacy of using modern viticulture and winemaking techniques to compete on the global wine market. With parts of the Rhône, particularly the northern regions of Hermitage and Côte-Rôtie, steeped in tradition, Colombo's view came across as controversial in the 1980s but slowly became accepted by a new wave of younger winemakers.

About his reputation, Colombo has joked that he is "the most hated and loved winemaker in the Rhône.

== Wines ==
Jean-Luc Colombo produces a number of wines from AOC regions across the northern and southern Rhône including a Hermitage, Cornas, Châteauneuf-du-Pape, Condrieu, Crozes-Hermitage, Saint-Joseph, Saint-Péray, Tavel and Côtes du Rhône. Additionally they produce several labels of vin de pays and negociant wines from the Rhône and Languedoc-Roussillon and a separate Provence wine label, Côte Bleue.
