= Saint-Romain-de-Lerps =

- Commune
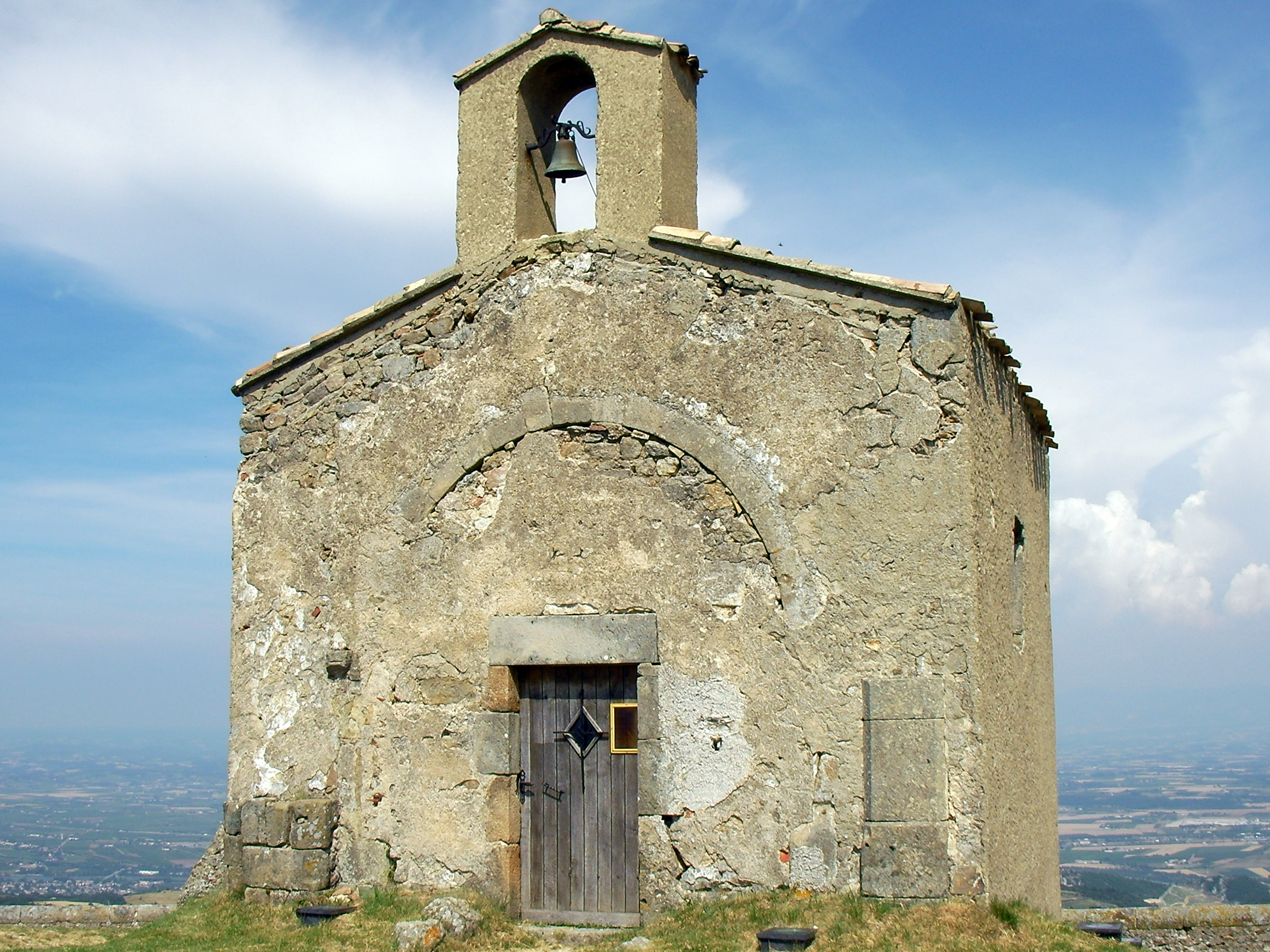
- The chapel in Saint-Romain-de-Lerps
- Location of Saint-Romain-de-Lerps
- Location within France Location within Auvergne-Rhône-Alpes
- Coordinates: 44°58′47″N 4°47′51″E
- Country: France
- Region: Auvergne-Rhône-Alpes
- Department: Ardèche
- Arrondissement: Tournon-sur-Rhône
- Canton: Guilherand-Granges

Government
  - Mayor (2020–2026): Anne Simon
- Area^{1}: 14.14 km^{2} (5.46 sq mi)
- Highest elevation: 650 m (2,130 ft)
- Lowest elevation: 200 m (660 ft)
- Population (2023): 1,034
  - Density: 73.13/km^{2} (189.4/sq mi)
- Time zone: UTC+01:00 (CET)
  - Summer (DST): UTC+02:00 (CEST)
- INSEE/Postal code: 07293 /07130
- ^{1} French Land Register data, which excludes lakes, ponds, glaciers > 1 km^{2} (0.386 sq mi or 247 acres) and river estuaries.

Saint-Romain-de-Lerps (French pronunciation: [sɛ̃ ʁɔmɛ̃ də lɛʁ]; Occitan: Sant Romain de Lerps) is a commune in the Ardèche department in southern France.

== Population ==
Historical population
Year	Pop.	±% p.a.
1968	342	—
1975	346	+0.17%
1982	415	+2.63%
1990	477	+1.76%
1999	540	+1.39%
2007	690	+3.11%
2012	781	+2.51%
2017	873	+2.25%
2023	1,034	+2.86%
Source: INSEE

== See also ==
- Communes of the Ardèche department
