= Embedded value =

The Embedded Value (EV) of a life insurance company is the present value of future profits plus adjusted net asset value. It is a construct from the field of actuarial science which allows insurance companies to be valued.

== Background ==
Life insurance policies are long-term contracts, where the policyholder pays a premium to be covered against a possible future event (such as the death of the policyholder).

Future income for the insurer consists of premiums paid by policyholders whilst future outgoings comprise claims paid to policyholders as well as various expenses. The difference, combined with income on and release of statutory reserves, represents future profit. See Value of in-force.

Net asset value is the difference between the total assets and liabilities of an insurance company.

For companies, the net asset value is usually calculated at book value. This needs to be adjusted to market values for EV purposes. Furthermore, this value may be discounted to reflect the "lock in" of some of the assets by their nature. (An example of such a lock-in would be assets held within the with-profits fund)

== Value of the insurer ==
EV measures the value of the insurer by adding today's value of the existing business (i.e. future profits) to the market value of net assets (i.e. accumulated past profits).

It is a conservative measure of the insurer's value in the sense that it only considers future profits from existing policies and so ignores the possibility that the insurer may sell new policies in future. It also excludes goodwill. As a result, the insurer is worth more than its EV.

== Formula ==
Embedded Value is calculated as follows:

EV = PVFP + ANAV

where

EV = Embedded Value
PVFP = present value of future profits
ANAV = adjusted net asset value

== Improvements ==
European embedded value (EEV) is a variation of EV which was set up by the CFO Forum which allows for a more formalised method of choosing the parameters and doing the calculations, to enable greater transparency and comparability.

Market Consistent Embedded Value is a more generalised methodology, of which EEV is one example.
