= EEV =

EEV or EeV may refer to:

- English Electric Valve Company, a designer, developer and manufacturer of electronic components and sub-systems
- Enhanced environmentally friendly vehicle, a car category used in European emission standards
- Equine encephalosis virus, a species of virus
- European embedded value, a type of embedded value in finance
- EeV (10^{18} electronvolts), a unit of energy

== See also ==
- EEVBlog (Electronics Engineering Video Blog), a blog and YouTube channel by David L. Jones
