= Châteaubourg =

Châteaubourg is the name of 2 communes in France:

- Châteaubourg, Ardèche
- Châteaubourg, Ille-et-Vilaine
