= Cantons of the Ardèche department =

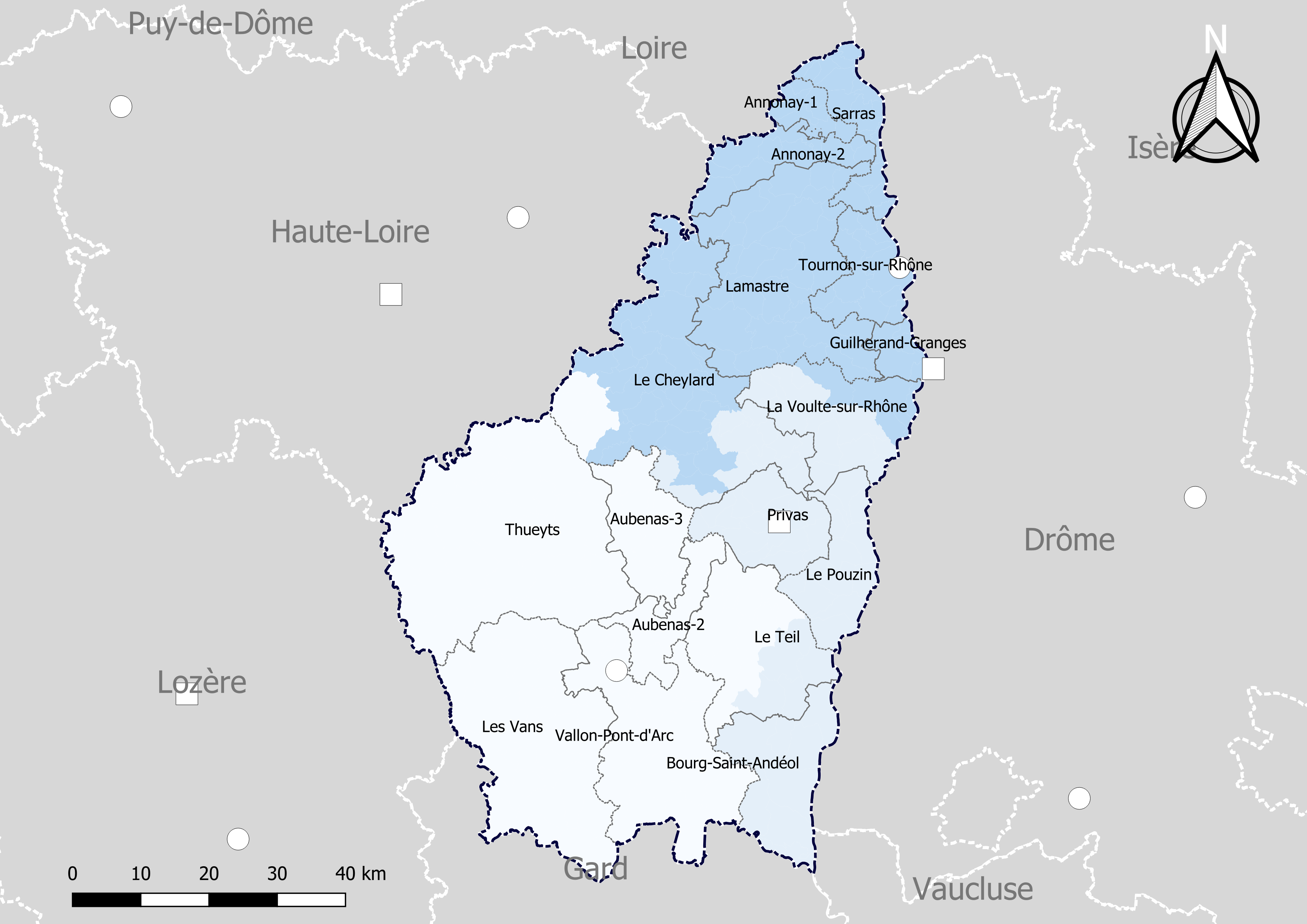
A map of the cantons of Ardèche with their seats

The following is a list of the 17 cantons of the Ardèche department (with their respective seats), in France, following the canton reorganisation that came into effect in March 2015:

- Annonay-1 (Annonay): 6 communes and part of Annonay
- Annonay-2 (Annonay): 9 communes and part of Annonay
- Aubenas-1 (Aubenas): 14 communes and part of Aubenas
- Aubenas-2 (Aubenas): 14 communes and part of Aubenas
- Berg-Helvie (Le Teil): 19 communes
- Bourg-Saint-Andéol (Bourg-Saint-Andéol): 9 communes
- Les Cévennes ardéchoises (Les Vans): 35 communes
- Guilherand-Granges (Guilherand-Granges): 5 communes
- Haut-Eyrieux (Le Cheylard): 44 communes
- Haut-Vivarais (Lamastre): 31 communes
- Haute-Ardèche (Thueyts): 40 communes
- Le Pouzin (Le Pouzin): 13 communes
- Privas (Privas): 15 communes
- Rhône-Eyrieux (La Voulte-sur-Rhône): 17 communes
- Sarras (Sarras): 19 communes
- Tournon-sur-Rhône (Tournon-sur-Rhône): 13 communes
- Vallon-Pont-d'Arc (Vallon-Pont-d'Arc): 30 communes
