= Arrondissements of the Ardèche department =

Administrative divisions of Ardèche, France

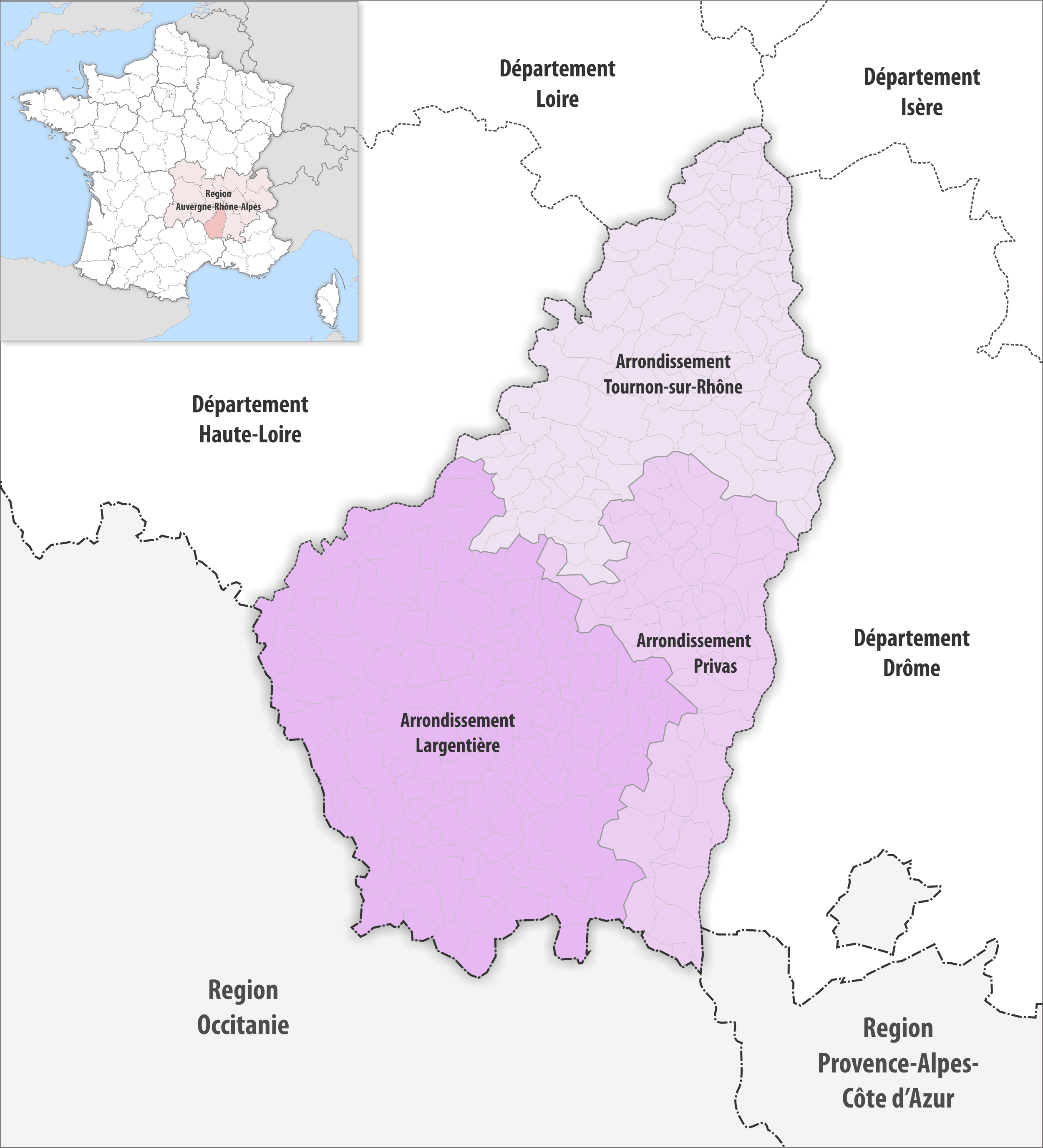
Map of arrondissements of the Ardèche department.

The 3 arrondissements of the Ardèche department are:

1. Arrondissement of Largentière, (subprefecture: Largentière) with 151 communes. The population of the arrondissement was 103,712 in 2021.
2. Arrondissement of Privas, (prefecture of the Ardèche department: Privas) with 66 communes. The population of the arrondissement was 86,154 in 2021.
3. Arrondissement of Tournon-sur-Rhône, (subprefecture: Tournon-sur-Rhône) with 118 communes. The population of the arrondissement was 141,549 in 2021.

== History ==
In 1800 the arrondissements of Privas, Largentière, Tournon were established. All of them have never been disbanded. In 2007 the four cantons of Antraigues-sur-Volane, Aubenas, Vals-les-Bains and Villeneuve-de-Berg from the arrondissement of Privas were assigned to the arrondissement of Largentière.

The borders of the arrondissements of Ardèche were again modified in January 2017:

- two communes from the arrondissement of Privas to the arrondissement of Largentière
- five communes from the arrondissement of Privas to the arrondissement of Tournon-sur-Rhône
- three communes from the arrondissement of Tournon-sur-Rhône to the arrondissement of Largentière
- eight communes from the arrondissement of Tournon-sur-Rhône to the arrondissement of Privas
