= Ardèche's 3rd constituency =

Constituency of the National Assembly of France

3rd constituency of Ardèche
- inline Constituency of the National Assembly of France

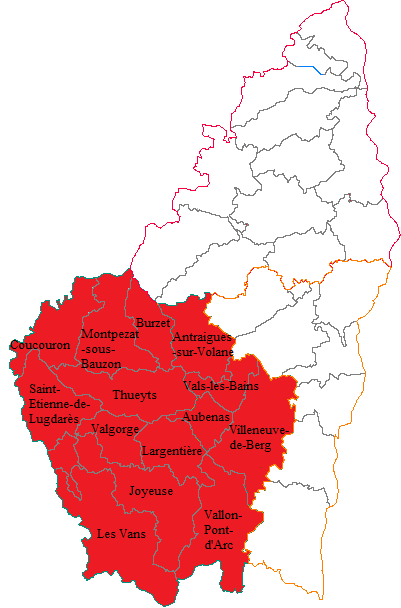
- constituency's location in Ardèche

- Ardèche's location in France
- Deputy: Fabrice Brun; LR
- Department: Ardèche
- Cantons: Antraigues, Aubenas, Burzet, Coucouron, Joyeuse, Largentière, Montpezat-sous-Bauzon, Saint-Étienne-de-Lugdarès, Thueyts, Valgorge, Vallon-Pont-d'Arc, Vals-les-Bains, Les Vans, Villeneuve-de-Berg
- Registered voters: 94,793

The 3rd constituency of Ardèche is a French legislative constituency in the Ardèche département.

== Deputies ==
Election	Member	Party
1988	Jean-Marie Alaize	PS
1993	Jean-Marie Roux	RPR
1997	Stéphane Alaize	PS
2002	Jean-Claude Flory	UMP
2007	Jean-Claude Flory	UMP
2012	Sabine Buis	PS
2017	Fabrice Brun	LR
2022	Fabrice Brun	LR
2024	Fabrice Brun	LR

== Election results ==
=== 2024 ===
Candidate	Party	Alliance	First round			Second round		
Candidate	Party	Alliance	Votes	%	+/–	Votes	%	+/–
Cyrille Grangier	RN		18,328	31.95	+16.45	20,379	34.59	
Florence Pallot	LFI	NFP	16,239	28.31	+1.63	18,125	30.76	
Fabrice Brun	DVD		15,194	26.48	N/A	20,414	34.65	
Quentin Bonnetain	RE	ENS	5,984	10.43	-2.73			
Christophe Marchisio	LO		482	0.84	+0.17			
Jacques Marcesse	REC		479	0.83	-1.99			
Laurent Touzet	R!		331	0.58	N/A			
Alexandre Faure	EXG		327	0.57	N/A			
Félix Zaguedoun-Reynaud	DIV		7	0.01	N/A			
Valid votes			57,371	97.76	-0.82	58,918	98.13	
Blank votes			845	1.44	+0.41	789	1.31	
Null votes			471	0.80	+0.41	335	0.56	
Turnout			58,687	72.43	+16.03	60,042	74.12	
Abstentions			22,335	27.57	-16.03	20,969	25.88	
Registered voters			81,022			81,011		
Source: Ministry of the Interior, Le Monde
Result						LR HOLD		

=== 2022 ===
Legislative Election 2022: Ardèche's 3rd constituency
Party	Candidate	Votes	%	±%
LFI (NUPÉS)	Florence Pallot	11,989	26.68	-12.36
LR (UDC)	Fabrice Brun	11,217	24.96	+5.41
RN	Johan Verheij	6,964	15.50	+3.67
DVG	Laurent Ughetto*	5,934	13.21	N/A
PRV (Ensemble)	Alexandra Cauquil	5,913	13.16	−11.95
REC	Gérald Gandon	1,268	2.82	N/A
Others	N/A	1,651	-	−
Turnout		44,936	56.40	+0.62
2nd round result
LR (UDC)	Fabrice Brun	24,896	57.11	+2.34
LFI (NUPÉS)	Florence Pallot	18,697	42.89	N/A
Turnout		43,593	57.07	+10.09
LR hold				

* Ughetto stood as a dissident member of PS, without the support of the NUPES alliance, of which PS is a member.

=== 2017 ===
Candidate	Label	First round		Second round	
Candidate	Label	Votes	%	Votes	%
Matthieu Peyraud	REM	10,748	25.11	13,976	45.23
Fabrice Brun	LR	8,365	19.55	16,926	54.77
Sabine Buis	PS	7,741	18.09		
Alain Joffre	FI	5,970	13.95		
Thierry Arsac	FN	5,064	11.83		
Guillaume Vermorel	ECO	1,881	4.40		
Carole Daudan	PCF	1,114	2.60		
Amandine Mollier	DVD	468	1.09		
Jean-Pierre Méjean	DLF	458	1.07		
Caroline Baldan	DIV	306	0.71		
Alain Coppens	EXD	303	0.71		
Coralie Laurent	EXG	209	0.49		
Laurent Touzet	DVD	171	0.40		
Votes		42,798	100.00	30,902	100.00
Valid votes		42,798	98.02	30,902	84.06
Blank votes		586	1.34	4,133	11.24
Null votes		277	0.63	1,729	4.70
Turnout		43,661	55.78	36,764	46.98
Abstentions		34,606	44.22	41,487	53.02
Registered voters		78,267		78,251	
Source: Ministry of the Interior

=== 2012 ===
Summary of the 10 June and 17 June 2012 French legislative in Ardèche’s 3rd Constituency election results
Candidate	Party		1st round		2nd round	
Candidate	Party		Votes	%	Votes	%
Sabine Buis	Socialist Party	PS	16,478	33.26%	25,536	51.23%
Jean-Claude Flory	Union for a Popular Movement	UMP	18,442	37.22%	24,309	48.77%
Isabelle Ciet	National Front	FN	5,808	11.72%		
Véronique Louis	Left Front	FG	4,537	9.16%		
Magalie Margotton	The Greens	VEC	2,528	5.10%		
Roger Kappel		CEN	590	1.19%		
Richard Neuville	Far Left	EXG	474	0.96%		
Alain Chalvet	Miscellaneous Right	DVD	272	0.55%		
Michel Sabatier	Far Left	EXG	251	0.51%		
Béatrice Cauvin	Far Left	EXG	162	0.33%		
Total			49,542	100%	49,845	100%
Registered voters			76,073		76,071	
Blank/Void ballots			583	1.16%	1,232	2.41%
Turnout			50,125	65.89%	51,077	67.14%
Abstentions			25,948	34.11%	24,994	32.86%
Result					PS GAIN	

=== 2007 ===
Summary of the 10 June and 17 June 2007 French legislative in Ardèche’s 3rd Constituency election results
Candidate	Party		1st round		2nd round	
Candidate	Party		Votes	%	Votes	%
Jean-Claude Flory	Union for a Popular Movement	UMP	22,370	46.92%	26,082	55.59%
Véronique Louis	Socialist Party	PS	8,811	18.48%	20,836	44.41%
Stéphane Alaize	Miscellaneous Left	DVG	3,952	8.29%		
Joseph Surrel	Democratic Movement	MoDem	2,359	4.95%		
Mireille Ponton	Communist	COM	1,999	4.19%		
Eric Arnou	The Greens	VEC	1,628	3.41%		
Suzanne Laurent	National Front	FN	1,448	3.04%		
Yann Kindo	Far Left	EXG	1,417	2.97%		
Bernard Brottes	Hunting, Fishing, Nature, Traditions	CPNT	1,178	2.47%		
Daniel Romet	Far Left	EXG	882	1.85%		
Jean-Pierre Deho	Ecologist	ECO	444	0.93%		
Sandrine Ben Lahoussine	Divers	DIV	403	0.85%		
Marie-Paule Finot	Movement for France	MPF	342	0.72%		
Colette Largeron	Far Left	EXG	254	0.53%		
Sandrine Elvira	Far Right	EXD	188	0.39%		
Total			47,675	100%	46,918	100%
Registered voters			73,298		73,290	
Blank/Void ballots			805	1.66%	1,505	3.11%
Turnout			48,480	66.14%	48,423	66.07%
Abstentions			24,818	33.86%	24,867	33.93%
Result					UMP HOLD	

=== 2002 ===
Legislative Election 2002: Ardèche's 3rd constituency
Party	Candidate	Votes	%	±%
UMP	Jean-Claude Flory	17,989	38.53	
PS	Stéphane Alaize	10,928	23.41	
FN	Suzanne Laurent	3,352	7.18	
DVG	Gerard Bruchet	3,323	7.12	
PCF	Henri Delauche	2,586	5.54	
CPNT	Bernard Brottes	2,095	4.49	
DVD	Gabriel Comte	1,692	3.62	
LV	Odile Arnou-Duflot	1,517	3.25	
Others	N/A	3,201		
Turnout		47,618	69.91	
2nd round result
UMP	Jean-Claude Flory	24,746	57.23	
PS	Stéphane Alaize	18,493	42.77	
Turnout		45,912	67.40	
UMP gain from PS				

=== 1997 ===
Legislative Election 1997: Ardèche's 3rd constituency
Party	Candidate	Votes	%	±%
RPR	Jean-Marie Roux	13,706	31.37	
PS	Stéphane Alaize	12,363	28.30	
FN	Thierry Arsac	6,244	14.29	
PCF	Henri Delauche	5,452	12.48	
MEI	Bernard Egal	2,447	5.60	
GE	Pierre Courouble	1,791	4.10	
MPF	Ulysse Barbe	1,184	2.71	
DVD	Roger Kapel	500	1.14	
Turnout		45,942	71.48	
2nd round result
PS	Stéphane Alaize	24,540	52.48	
RPR	Jean-Marie Roux	22,225	47.52	
Turnout		49,564	77.13	
PS gain from RPR				

== Sources ==
- French Interior Ministry results website: "Résultats électoraux officiels en France" (in French).
