= Cornas AOC =

French wine geographic appellation

- Wine region
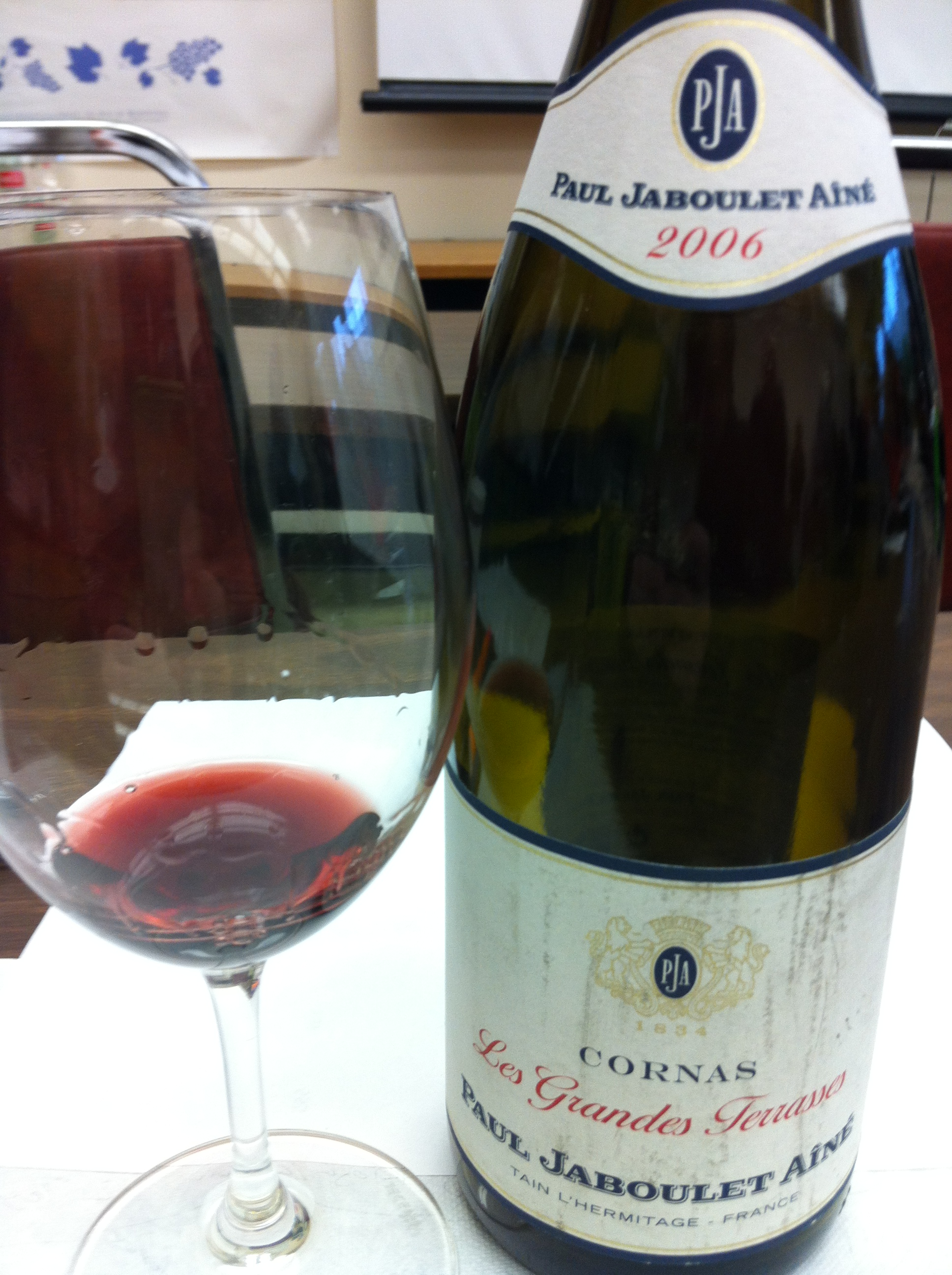
- Official name: Cornas
- Type: Appellation d'origine contrôlée
- Country: France
- Part of: Northern Rhone
- Other regions in Northern Rhone: Crozes-Hermitage, Saint-Joseph, Hermitage, Côte-Rôtie
- Climate region: continental climate
- Size of planted vineyards: 114 hectares
- Grapes produced: Syrah
- Wine produced: 4000 hl.

Cornas (French pronunciation: [kɔʁnas]) is a French wine Appellation d'Origine Contrôlée (AOC) in the northern Rhône wine region of France based in Cornas, south of Lyon. It is one of the smallest appellations in the Rhône valley and produces only red wine, from the Syrah grape.

== History ==
The name Cornas is Celtic for "burnt earth", and the first written sources mention wine in the region as early as 885. Both Louis XV and Cardinal Richelieu are said to have been admirers of the wine. Cornas became an official appellation in 1938 although it was not until 1950 that the first local producers began bottling the wine themselves.

== Climate and geography ==
Cornas, along with the rest of the northern Rhône, has a continental climate rather than the Mediterranean climate found in the south. However unlike some of the other northern Rhône appellations, Cornas is mostly shielded from the cold le mistral winds that can last into the Spring, and is often the first appellation in the north to begin the harvest. The vineyards are just north of Valence, in a fairly small area of steep slopes facing east-southeast, south of Tain l'Hermitage. The vineyards are situated between 100 metres (330 ft) and 400 metres (1,300 ft) above sea level. In the northern part, especially near "Les Chaillot", the soil contains chalk but is mostly sandy and rocky, with characteristic reddish-brown dirt. The sunny sector of "Quartier de Reynard" which has vines at 300 metres (980 ft) has a granite soil. To the south, near "La Côte" and "La Combe", the soil is mostly clay. It is a small appellation of only 90 hectares (220 acres), with an average output of 4,000 hectolitres (88,000 imp gal; 110,000 US gal). By way of comparison there are individual châteaux in Bordeaux which produce more wine than the entire Cornas appellation.

== Grapes and wine ==
Along with most wines produced in the northern Rhône, Cornas is a red wine made from the Syrah grape. No white wines are produced. Any wines designated Cornas AOC will be made from 100% Syrah by law. Although growers could plant different grape varieties in Cornas, the appellation is planted exclusively with Syrah as any wine made from other grapes would have to be sold under a different label, probably Côtes du Rhône AOC and as a result would fetch a lower price.

Cornas used to produce wines which required long ageing, but a new more fruit forward style has emerged under the impulse of winemaker Jean-Luc Colombo. Several producers still produce a more traditional style which typically requires 6–7 years in barrel and bottle before it is approachable.
