= Olivier Amrane =

French politician (born 1978)

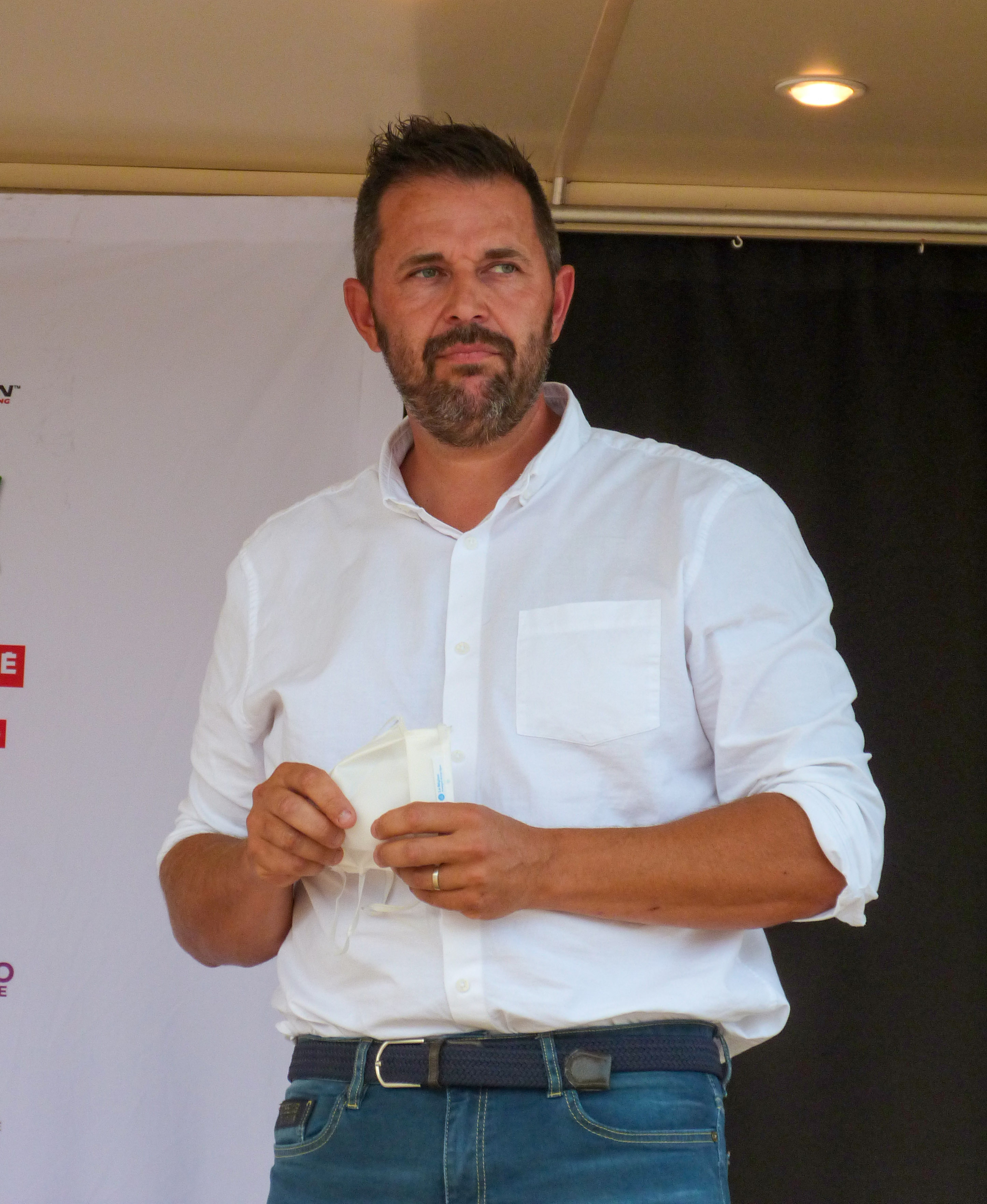
- Amrane in 2023

President of the Departmental Council of Ardèche
- Incumbent
- Assumed office 1 July 2021
- Preceded by: Laurent Ughetto

Personal details
- Born: 23 March 1978 (age 48) Privas, France
- Party: The Republicans

Olivier Amrane (French pronunciation: [ɔlivje amʁan]; born 23 March 1978) is a French politician who has served as president of the Departmental Council of Ardèche since 2021. He has represented the canton of Guilherand-Granges since 2021, previously serving as deputy mayor of Saint-Péray from 2014 to 2021. Amrane is a member of The Republicans (LR).

He has also been a member of the Regional Council of Auvergne-Rhône-Alpes since 2016 and has served as its vice president for agriculture since 2024.
