= Châteaubourg, Ardèche =

Châteaubourg
- Commune
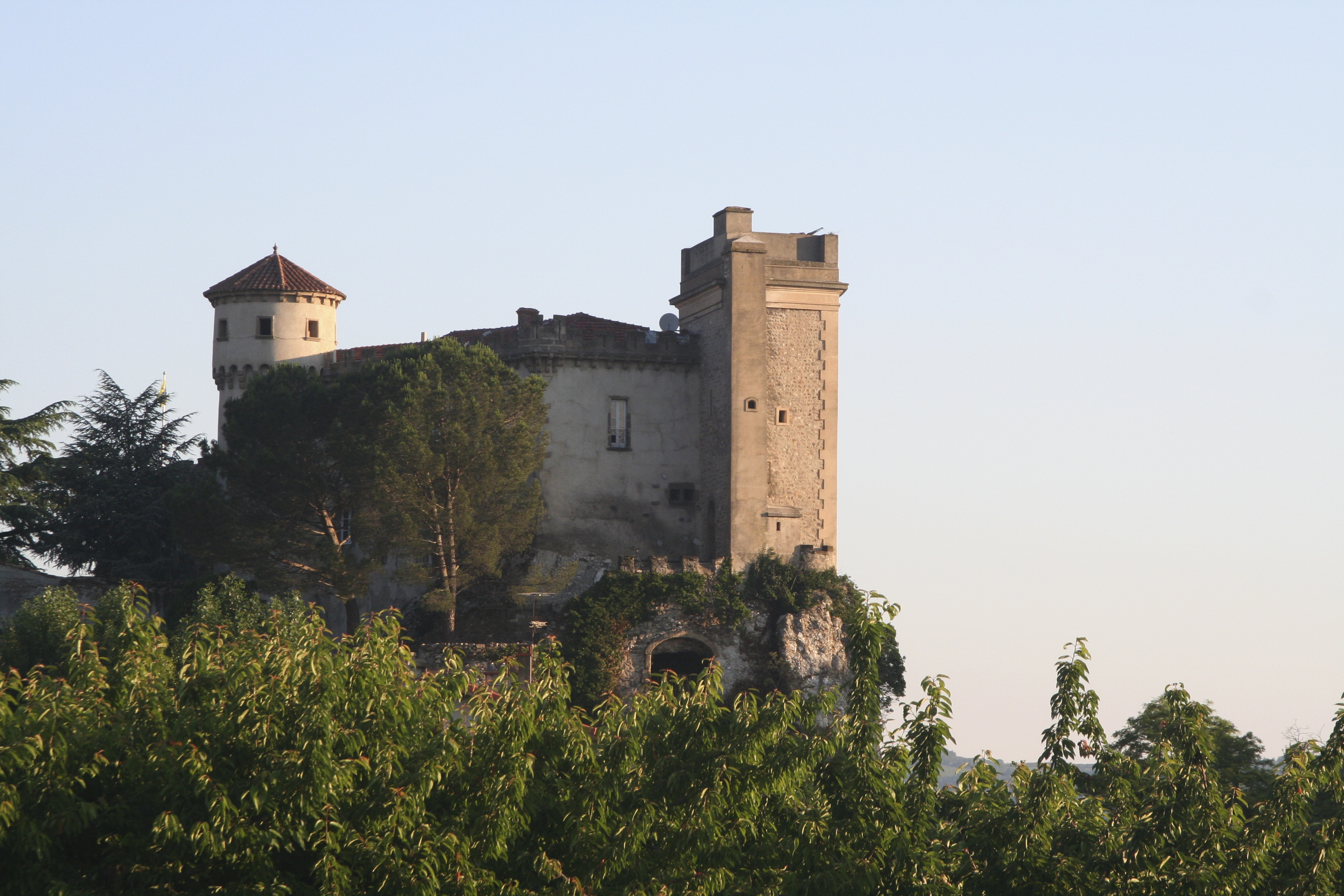
- The chateau in Châteaubourg
- Location of Châteaubourg
- Location within France Location within Auvergne-Rhône-Alpes
- Coordinates: 44°59′52″N 4°50′39″E
- Country: France
- Region: Auvergne-Rhône-Alpes
- Department: Ardèche
- Arrondissement: Tournon-sur-Rhône
- Canton: Guilherand-Granges
- Intercommunality: Rhône Crussol

Government
  - Mayor (2023–2026): Bertille Allemand
- Area^{1}: 4.27 km^{2} (1.65 sq mi)
- Elevation: 128 m (420 ft)
- Highest elevation: 444 m (1,457 ft)
- Lowest elevation: 106 m (348 ft)
- Population (2023): 227
  - Density: 53.2/km^{2} (138/sq mi)
- Time zone: UTC+01:00 (CET)
  - Summer (DST): UTC+02:00 (CEST)
- INSEE/Postal code: 07059 /07130
- ^{1} French Land Register data, which excludes lakes, ponds, glaciers > 1 km^{2} (0.386 sq mi or 247 acres) and river estuaries.

Châteaubourg (French pronunciation: [ʃatobuʁ]; Occitan: Chastelboc) is a commune in the Ardèche department in the Auvergne-Rhône-Alpes region in southern France.

== Population ==
Historical population
Year	Pop.	±% p.a.
1968	162	—
1975	165	+0.26%
1982	180	+1.25%
1990	209	+1.88%
1999	204	−0.27%
2007	207	+0.18%
2012	222	+1.41%
2017	244	+1.91%
2023	227	−1.20%
Source: INSEE

== See also ==
- Communes of the Ardèche department
