= Cornas =

- Commune
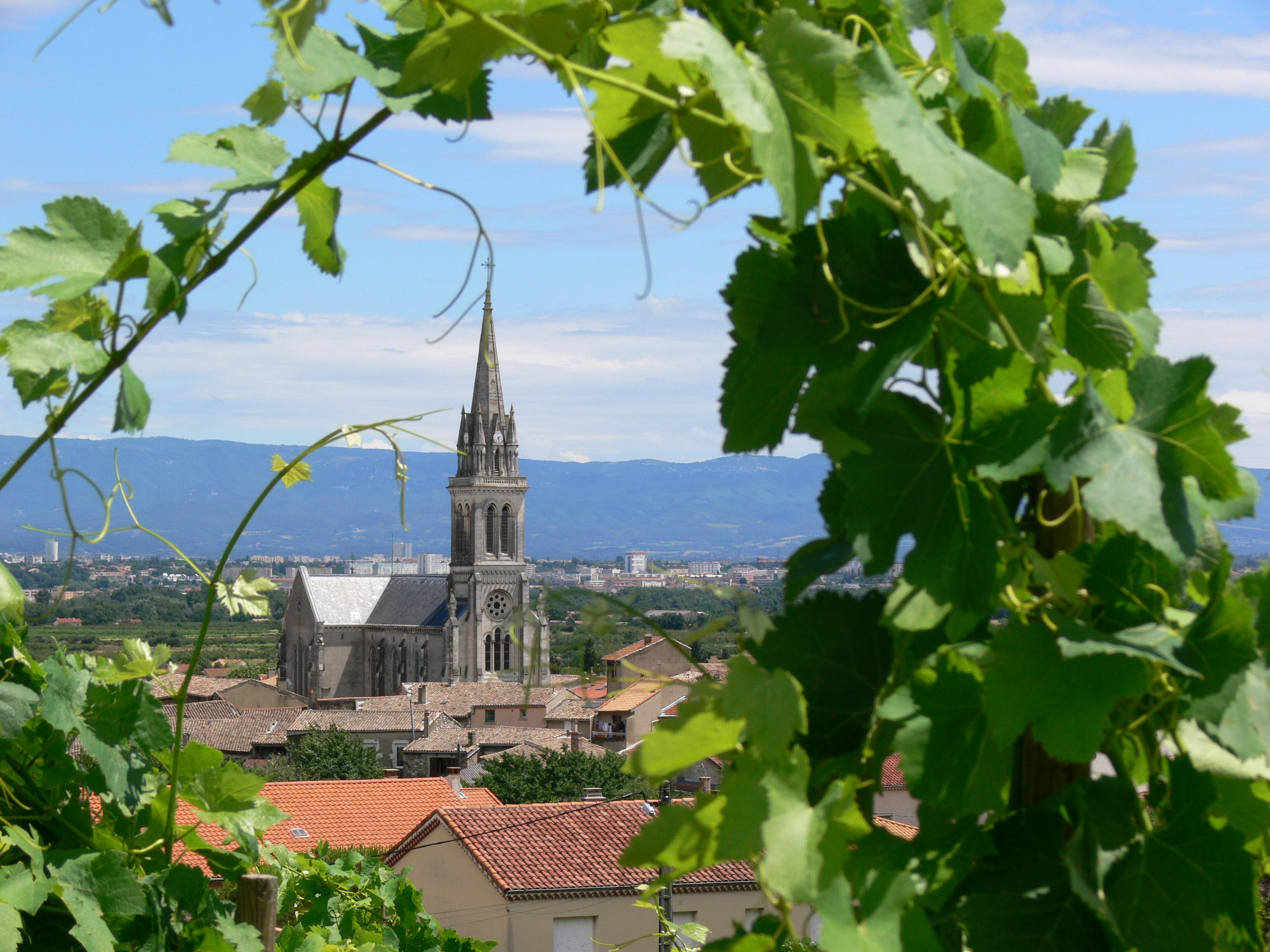
- The church and surroundings in Cornas

- Coat of arms
- Location of Cornas
- Location within France Location within Auvergne-Rhône-Alpes
- Coordinates: 44°57′40″N 4°51′00″E
- Country: France
- Region: Auvergne-Rhône-Alpes
- Department: Ardèche
- Arrondissement: Tournon-sur-Rhône
- Canton: Guilherand-Granges

Government
  - Mayor (2020–2026): Stéphane Lafage
- Area^{1}: 8.33 km^{2} (3.22 sq mi)
- Highest elevation: 492 m (1,614 ft)
- Lowest elevation: 98 m (322 ft)
- Population (2023): 2,410
  - Density: 289/km^{2} (749/sq mi)
- Time zone: UTC+01:00 (CET)
  - Summer (DST): UTC+02:00 (CEST)
- INSEE/Postal code: 07070 /07130
- ^{1} French Land Register data, which excludes lakes, ponds, glaciers > 1 km^{2} (0.386 sq mi or 247 acres) and river estuaries.

Cornas (French pronunciation: [kɔʁnas]; Occitan: Cornàs) is a commune in the département of Ardèche in the Auvergne-Rhône-Alpes region in southern France. The name is Celtic for "burnt land."

== Population ==
Historical population
Year	Pop.	±% p.a.
1968	717	—
1975	1,007	+4.97%
1982	1,563	+6.48%
1990	2,102	+3.77%
1999	2,082	−0.11%
2007	2,255	+1.00%
2012	2,240	−0.13%
2017	2,237	−0.03%
2023	2,410	+1.25%
Source: INSEE

== Economy ==
The region is famous for wine, which is designated Cornas AOC.

== See also ==
- Communes of the Ardèche department
