= Fabrice Brun =

French politician (born 1968)

Member of the National Assembly for Ardèche's 3rd constituency
- In office 18 June 2017 – 9 June 2024

Personal details
- Political party: The Republicans

Fabrice Brun (born 2 April 1968 in Avignon) is a French politician of the Republicans (LR) who has been serving as a member of the National Assembly since 18 June 2017, representing Ardèche's 3rd constituency.

== Political positions ==
Ahead of the Republicans’ 2022 convention, Brun endorsed Éric Ciotti as the party's chairman.

== See also ==
- 2017 French legislative election
