= European embedded value =

The European embedded value (EEV) is an effort by the CFO Forum to standardize the calculation of the embedded value. For this purpose the CFO Forum has released guidelines how embedded value should be calculated.

There is a lot of subjectivity involved in calculating the value of a life insurer. Insurance contracts are long-term contracts, so the value of the company now is dependent on how each of those contracts end up performing. Profit is made if the policyholder does not die, for example, and just contributes premiums over many years. Losses are possible for policies where the insured dies soon after signing the contract. And profitability is also affected by whether (and when) a policy might terminate early.

An actuary calculates an embedded value by making certain assumptions about life expectancy, persistency, investment conditions, and so on - thus making an estimate of what the company is worth now. But if each person has a different opinion on how things will turn out, you could expect a range of inconsistent estimates of the worth of the company. With this range of approaches, it is very difficult to compare EV calculations between companies.

The CFO Forum was formed to consider general issues relevant to measuring the value of insurance companies. The EEV was the output of this forum, and allows greater consistency in the such calculations, making them more useful.

== Types ==
EEV can be "real world" or "market consistent". The former takes the best estimate for parameters that are available, whereas the latter uses a slightly constrained set of parameters which are close to best estimate, but which produce results which match market-related hedge costs.

Real-world EEV usually uses a risk discount rate made up of the risk-free rate plus a risk margin which reflects the weighted average cost of capital and Beta from the CAPM model. Using company-level economic models clearly reflects a top-down approach to determining the risk discount rate.

Market-consistent EEV makes use of a bottom-up approach for determining the risk discount rate, which produces a number which equals the risk free rate plus an explicit allowance for operational risk and market risk.

Although initially there was an equal use of these two types of EEV, as time passes companies appear to be moving towards the market-consistent approach.
