= Guilherand-Granges =

- Commune
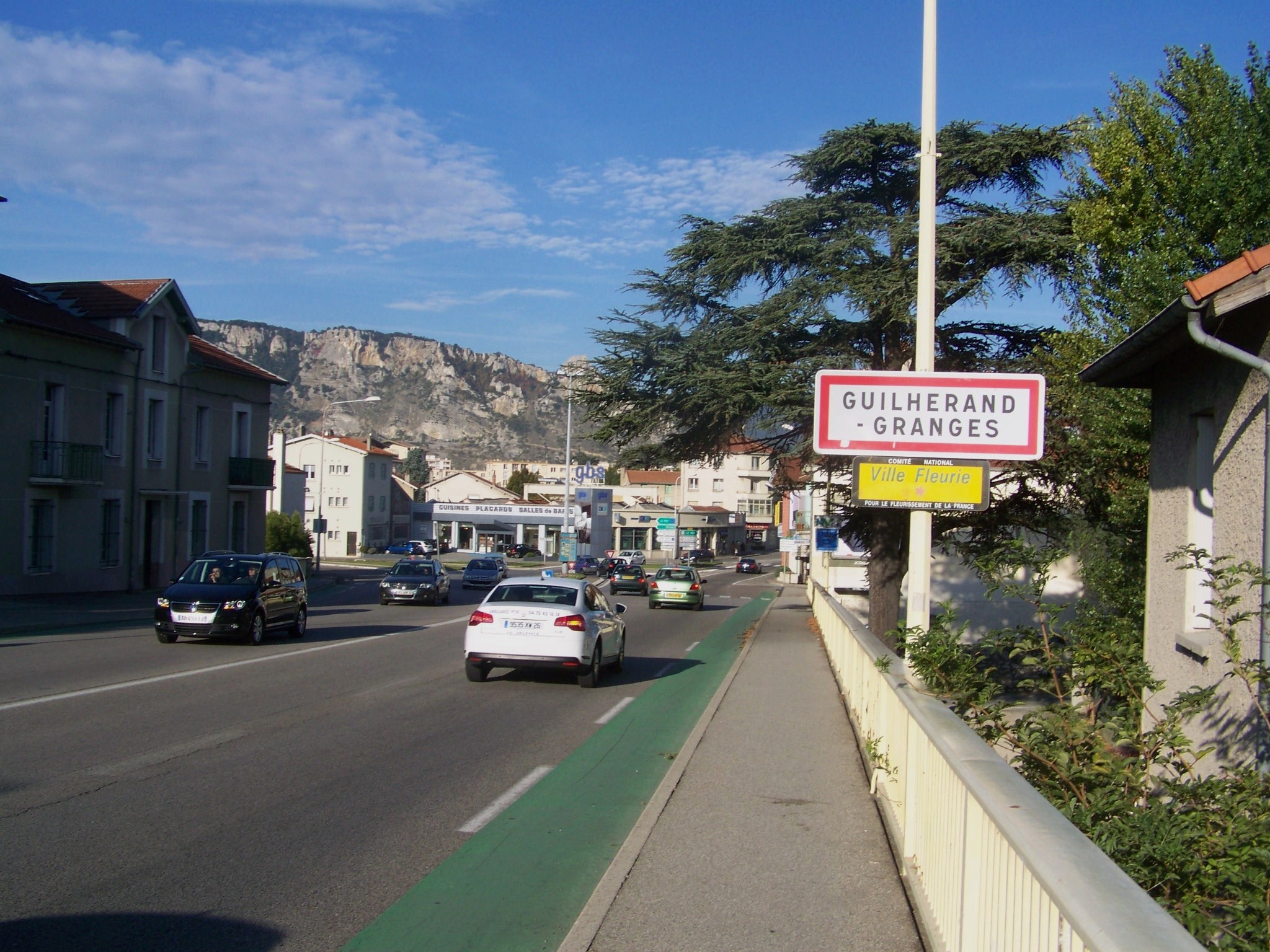
- The road into Guilherand-Granges

- Coat of arms
- Location of Guilherand-Granges
- Location within France Location within Auvergne-Rhône-Alpes
- Coordinates: 44°56′07″N 4°52′32″E
- Country: France
- Region: Auvergne-Rhône-Alpes
- Department: Ardèche
- Arrondissement: Tournon-sur-Rhône
- Canton: Guilherand-Granges
- Intercommunality: Rhône Crussol

Government
  - Mayor (2020–2026): Sylvie Gaucher
- Area^{1}: 6.55 km^{2} (2.53 sq mi)
- Elevation: 123 m (404 ft)
- Highest elevation: 407 m (1,335 ft)
- Lowest elevation: 106 m (348 ft)
- Population (2023): 11,235
  - Density: 1,720/km^{2} (4,440/sq mi)
- Time zone: UTC+01:00 (CET)
  - Summer (DST): UTC+02:00 (CEST)
- INSEE/Postal code: 07102 /07500
- ^{1} French Land Register data, which excludes lakes, ponds, glaciers > 1 km^{2} (0.386 sq mi or 247 acres) and river estuaries.

Guilherand-Granges (French pronunciation: [ɡijʁɑ̃ ɡʁɑ̃ʒ]; Vivaro-Alpine: Guilharand e las Granjas, before 1991: Guilherand) is a commune in the Ardèche department in southern France. It is a suburb of Valence, Drôme. It is one of the most populous communes in the Ardéche department, after Annonay and Aubenas, and before Tournon-sur-Rhône.

== Population ==
Historical population

Year	Pop.	±% p.a.
1793	67	—
1800	300	+23.88%
1806	297	−0.17%
1821	376	+1.58%
1831	470	+2.26%
1836	480	+0.42%
1841	579	+3.82%
1846	605	+0.88%
1851	608	+0.10%
1856	606	−0.07%
1861	592	−0.47%
1866	572	−0.68%
1872	541	−0.92%
1876	554	+0.60%
1881	568	+0.50%
1886	571	+0.11%
1891	592	+0.72%
1896	644	+1.70%
1901	600	−1.41%

Year	Pop.	±% p.a.
1906	658	+1.86%
1911	737	+2.29%
1921	910	+2.13%
1926	1,057	+3.04%
1931	1,230	+3.08%
1936	1,447	+3.30%
1946	1,743	+1.88%
1954	1,966	+1.52%
1962	4,433	+10.70%
1968	7,226	+8.48%
1975	8,966	+3.13%
1982	9,556	+0.91%
1990	10,492	+1.17%
1999	10,707	+0.23%
2007	10,847	+0.16%
2012	10,968	+0.22%
2017	10,961	−0.01%
2023	11,235	+0.41%

Source: EHESS and INSEE (1968-2023)

== See also ==
- Communes of the Ardèche department
