= Vignerons indépendants de France =

The VIdF logotype

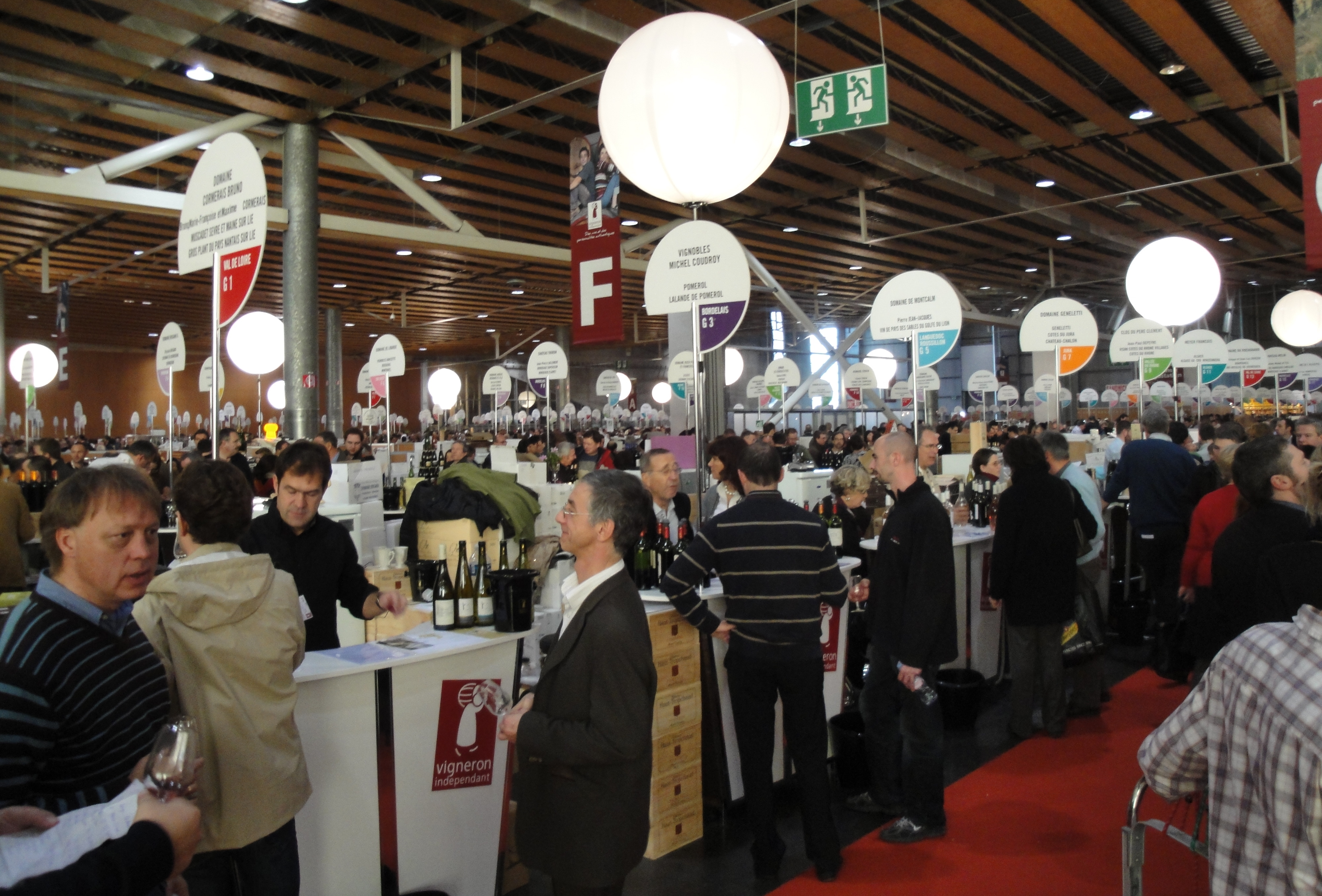
A Vignerons indépendant wine fair in Lille.

The Vignerons indépendants de France (VIF) (English: Independent winemakers of France) is a viticultural trade association based in Paris that promotes and assists small and independent winemakers within France, similar to the British Society of Independent Brewers (SIBA). Members may use the association's logo on their products. In 1978, it was set up as confédération nationale des caves particulières. (CNCP), but changed their name and their charter in 2003 to try to unite and support independent winemakers and help them fight to keep their independence against powerful winemaking cooperatives. They currently have between 6000 and 10000 members throughout France (as of 2009).

Each year, VIF arranges a number of wine fairs (Salon des vins) in different cities in France.

== History and representation ==
Founded in 1978, the organization was known as the confédération nationale des caves particulières (abbreviated CNCP. In English: national confederation of wine producers), chaired by François Chambovet. In 2003, the group's theme was changed, to help unite independent producers and bottlers.

Throughout France, regional branches of the federation help to support independent winemakers. The national Confederation is based in Paris, where the Steering Committee serves as the representative of the vignerons indépendants among the trade unions. The national Confederation also aids in promotion of and communication about the vignerons indépendants.

== Charter ==
The association's most important parts of its charter stipulate that members must:

- Respect their terroir
- Work and harvest their own vineyard
- Make the wine themselves
- Bottle their wine themselves
- Keep viticultural traditions
