= Ardèche =

Department in Auvergne-Rhône-Alpes, France

Ardèche Ardecha (Occitan)
- Department
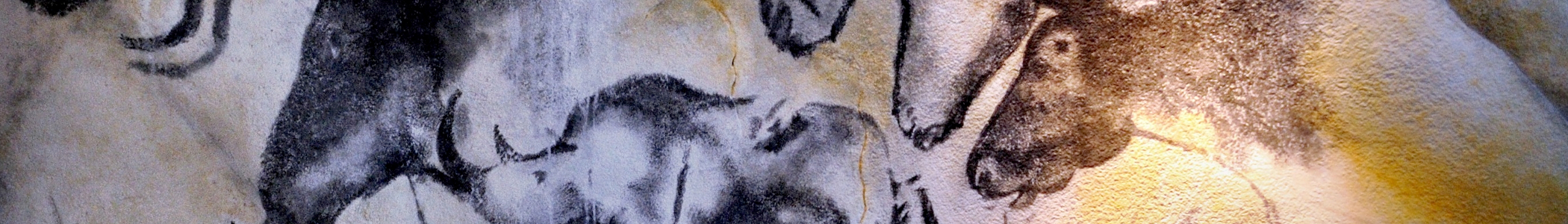
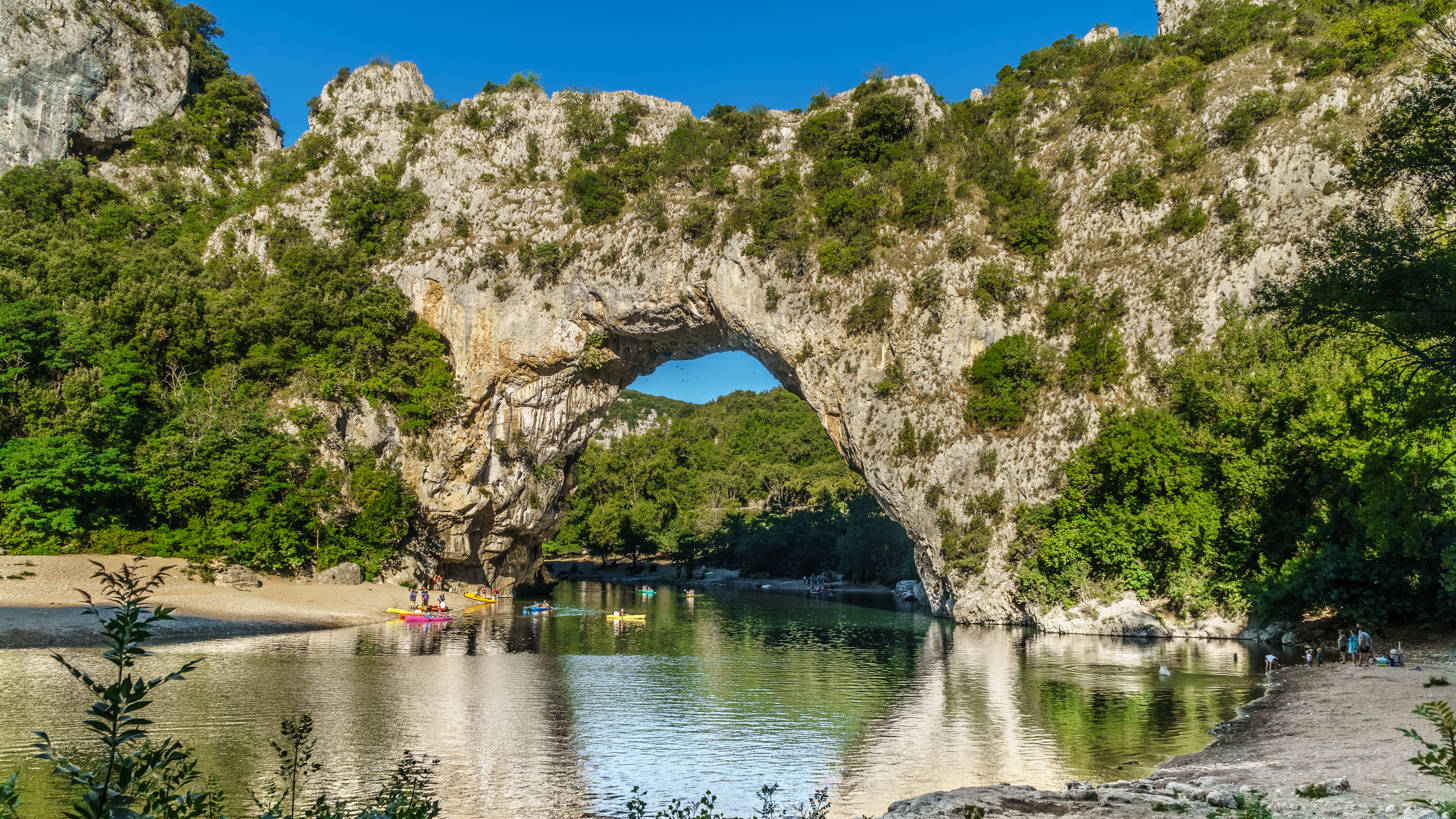
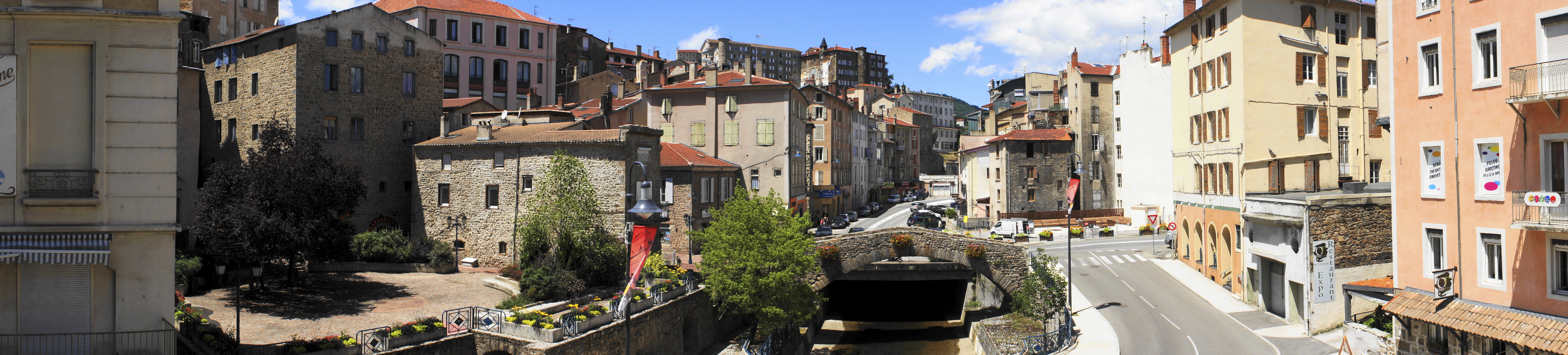
- From top down: Chauvet Cave, Pont d'Arc and Annonay

- Flag Coat of arms

- Location of Ardèche in France
- Coordinates: 44°40′N 4°25′E
- Country: France
- Region: Auvergne-Rhône-Alpes
- Prefecture: Privas
- Subprefectures: Largentière; Tournon-sur-Rhône

Government
  - President of the Departmental Council: Olivier Amrane (LR)

Area^{1}
  - Total: 5,529 km^{2} (2,135 sq mi)

Population (2023)
  - Total: 334,231
  - Rank: 73rd
  - Density: 60.45/km^{2} (156.6/sq mi)
- Time zone: UTC+1 (CET)
  - Summer (DST): UTC+2 (CEST)
- Department number: 07
- Largest city: Annonay
- Arrondissements: 3
- Cantons: 17
- Communes: 335
- ^1 French Land Register data, which exclude estuaries, and lakes, ponds, and glaciers larger than 1 km^{2}

Ardèche (French pronunciation: [aʁdɛʃ]; Occitan: Ardecha, pronounced [aɾˈdet͡ʃɔ]; Arpitan: Ardecha) is a department in Auvergne-Rhône-Alpes, Southeastern France. It is named after the river Ardèche and had a population of 334,231 as of 2023. Its prefecture is in Privas, but its largest city is Annonay.

== History ==
=== Prehistory and ancient history ===
Humans have inhabited the area at least since the Upper Paleolithic, as attested by the famous cave paintings at Chauvet Pont d'Arc. The Ardèche river plateau has extensive standing stones (mainly dolmens and some menhirs), erected thousands of years ago. The river has one of Europe's largest canyons, and the caves that dot the cliffs—which go as high as 300 metres (1,000 feet)—are known for signs of prehistoric inhabitants (arrowheads and flint knives are often found).

The Vivarais, as the Ardèche is still called, takes its name and coat of arms from Viviers, which was the capital of the Gaulish tribe of Helvii, part of Gallia Narbonensis, after the destruction of their previous capital at Alba-la-Romaine. Saint Andéol, a disciple of Polycarp, is supposed to have evangelized the Vivarais during the reign of Emperor Septimius Severus, and was supposedly martyred in 208. Legend tells of Andéol's burial by Amycia Eucheria Tullia. In 430, Auxonius transferred the see to Viviers as a result of the problems suffered at its previous site in Alba Augusta.

=== Medieval history ===
The Vivarais area suffered greatly in the 9th century with raids by Hungarians and Saracen slavers operating from the coast of Provence resulting in an overall depopulation of the region.

In the early 10th century, economic recovery saw the building of many Romanesque churches in the region, including Ailhon, Mercuer, Saint Julien du Serre, Balazuc, Niègles, and Rochecolombe. The medieval county of Viviers or Vivarais at this time was administratively a part of the Kingdom of Burgundy-Arles, formed in 933 by Rudolph II of Burgundy's fusion of Provence and Burgundy and bequeathed by its last monarch Rudolph III of Burgundy to the Holy Roman Emperor Conrad II in 1032. Locally throughout this period, the Church played an important role. John II (Giovanni of Siena), Cardinal and Bishop of Viviers (1073–1095), accompanied Pope Urban II to the Council of Clermont.

It was later held in fief by the Counts of Toulouse, who lost it to the French crown in 1229. In 1284, with the Cistercian Abbey of Marzan, Philip IV established Villeneuve de Berg, and by the treaty of 10 July 1305 Philip IV of France obliged the bishops of Vivarais to admit the sovereignty of the kings of France over all their temporal domain. The realm was largely ignored by the Emperors and was finally granted to France as part of the domain of the Dauphin, the future Charles VII of Valois in 1308. During this period, the Maillard family, as Counts of Tournon, were influential in the Ardèche. During the Hundred Years War, the area maintained its loyalty to the French crown despite frequent attacks from the west.

=== Early modern history ===
As a result of the reformation of John Calvin in Geneva, the Vivarais Ardèche was one of the areas that strongly embraced Protestantism partly as a result of Jacques Valery's missionary activity in 1534. During the Wars of Religion (1562–1598), the Ardèche was considered a strategically important location between Protestant Geneva, Lyon, and Catholic Languedoc. The region had prospered with the introduction of tobacco growing from America, and the agrarian experiments of Olivier de Serres, father of modern French agriculture. The influence of Protestant Lyon, and the growth of the silk industry, thanks to the planting of mulberry trees, gave the burghers of the Vivarais towns a certain independence of thinking, and with the support of powerful Protestant Huguenots (the Comte de Crussol and Olivier de Serres), the Vivarais became a Protestant stronghold. As a result, it suffered many attacks and eight pitched battles between 1562 and 1595. In 1598, the Edict of Nantes put an end to these struggles. At that time, the Vivarais had over 75 Protestant churches and five fortified strongholds with permanent garrisons. But the area's problems were not over. In 1629, Paule de Chambaud, daughter of the Huguenot lord of Privas, chose instead to marry a Catholic, the Vicomte de l'Estrange, who supported Cardinal Richelieu's persecution of Protestants. With a majority of the population Protestant, Privas refused to submit, and as a centre of the revolt of the Benjamin de Rohan, duc de Soubise, was burned to the ground by the forces of Louis XIII, sent to support the Vicomte de l'Estrange. As a result, one-fifth of the Vivarais Protestant population emigrated.

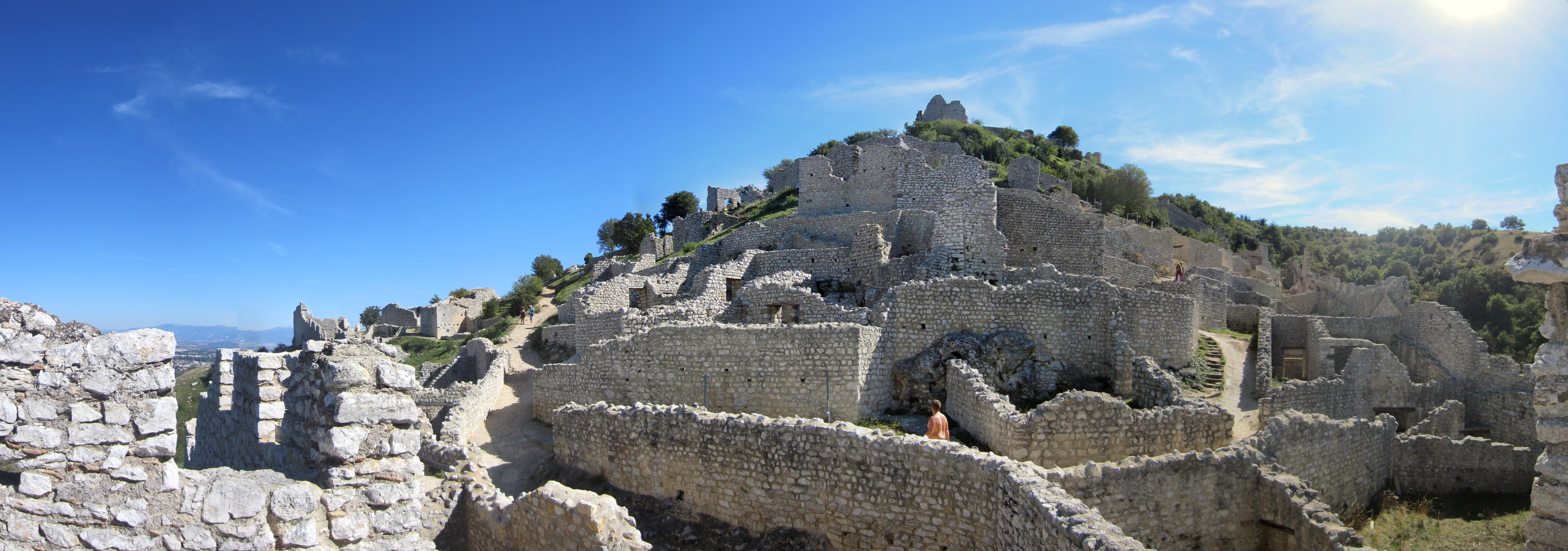
Château de Crussol

The Revocation of the Edict of Nantes in 1685, which outlawed Protestantism, led the peasant family of Marie and Pierre Durand to revolt against royal authority. This led to the Camisard revolt of the Ardèche prophets. Louis XIV responded by dispatching Dragoons, who brutalised the population by "dragonnades", destroying a number of communities. The brutality of those years was enormous and peace was restored only in 1715. As a result of brutality on both sides, another 50,000 Archèche Protestants fled France, many for Switzerland, whilst others were forced into abjuration (conversion).

In the next century, despite the growth of the community of Annonay, increasing polarisation between the upper nobility families such as Rohan Soubise, and Vogue, Count of Aubenas, possessing huge financial fortunes, and the lesser nobility, the village clergy and the bourgeoisie of the Vivarais paralleled developments elsewhere in France. Despite this, the sons of a local Annonay paper-maker, Joseph and Jacques Etienne Montgolfier, ascended in the first hot air balloon over the town on 4 June 1783. The firm of Canson Mongolfier continues making paper to this day and every year on the first weekend in June a large hot air balloon gathering celebrates the first journey. At the 200th anniversary in 1983, some 50 hot air balloons took part with the first historic flight reenacted with people dressed in period costume.

=== Later modern history ===
Ardèche in 1790

At the beginning of the French Revolution, the 1789 Declaration of Human Rights at last recognised Ardèche Protestants as citizens in their own right, free at last to practise their faith. Catholicism nonetheless continued to expand, and by the early 19th century the Ardèche included only 34,000 Protestants out of a population of 290,000. Named after the river of the same name, the Ardèche was one of the original 83 departments created during the French Revolution on 4 March 1790. The support of Count François Antoine de Boissy d'Anglas representing the Third Estate of the Vivarais in the States General, the freeing of the serfs, and the support of the lesser clergy of the church ensured that the Ardèchois supported the early revolution, but they withdrew support when things became more radical. During the Reign of Terror, in 1794, the guillotine at Privas was kept busy with the execution of the former moderate supporters of the revolution. Under the Directory, bands of Chouans took to the Cevennes to escape and support former émigrés.

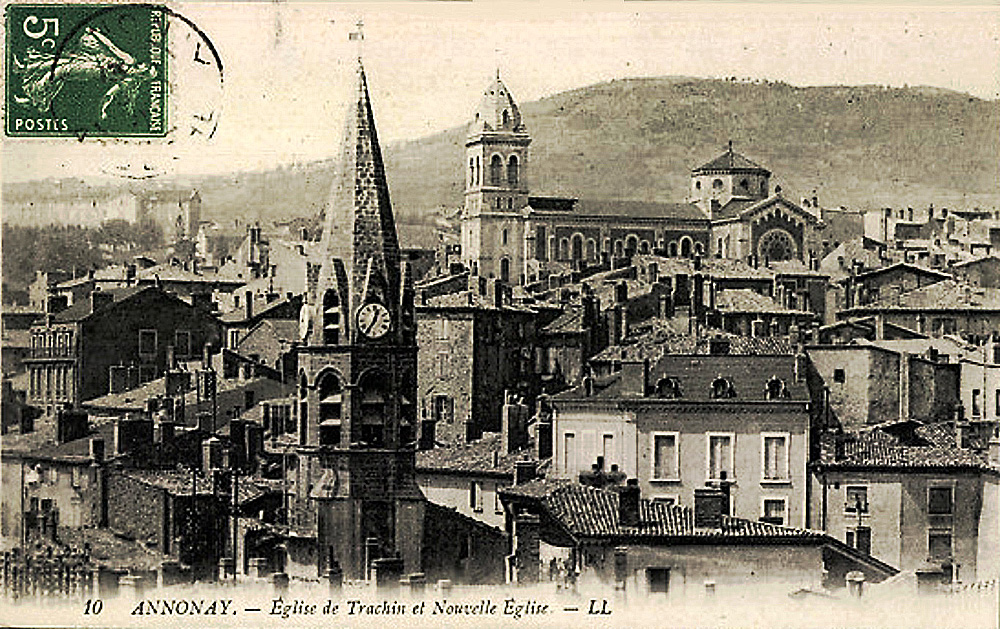
Annonay in the early 20th century

In the Napoleonic period, the Ardèche entered a period of increasingly prosperous inconspicuousness. After a period of eclipse, Viviers was reestablished in 1822 as the site of the see of the bishops of Ardèche, where it remains to this day. During the 19th century, modest economic growth took place. The population grew from 273,000 in 1793 to 388,500 in 1861. The silkworm industry boomed until 1855, when disease affected the worms and competition with China undermined the industry's profitability. Mining at Privas saw the exploitation of local iron ore, which was quickly depleted. As a result, six blast furnaces were established, but they were only moderately profitable, the last closing at Pouzain in 1929.

The scientific pioneer Marc Seguin, whose inventions played a key role in the development of early locomotives, was born in the department. But Seguin located his business upstream, near Lyon, and industrial development in the Ardèche remained relatively small-scale. No large towns appeared in the department during the years of France's industrialisation, and its official population total of 388,500, reached in 1861, turned out to be a peak that has not since been matched. Since the 1860s, the Ardèche economy has been split between the prosperous Rhône valley and the relatively poor and mountainous Haut Vivarais on the department's western side. Sheep farming did not lead to the prosperity hoped for and wine growing, badly hit by the phylloxera crisis during the last decades of the 19th century, has had to compete with other more established areas of France.

== Geography ==
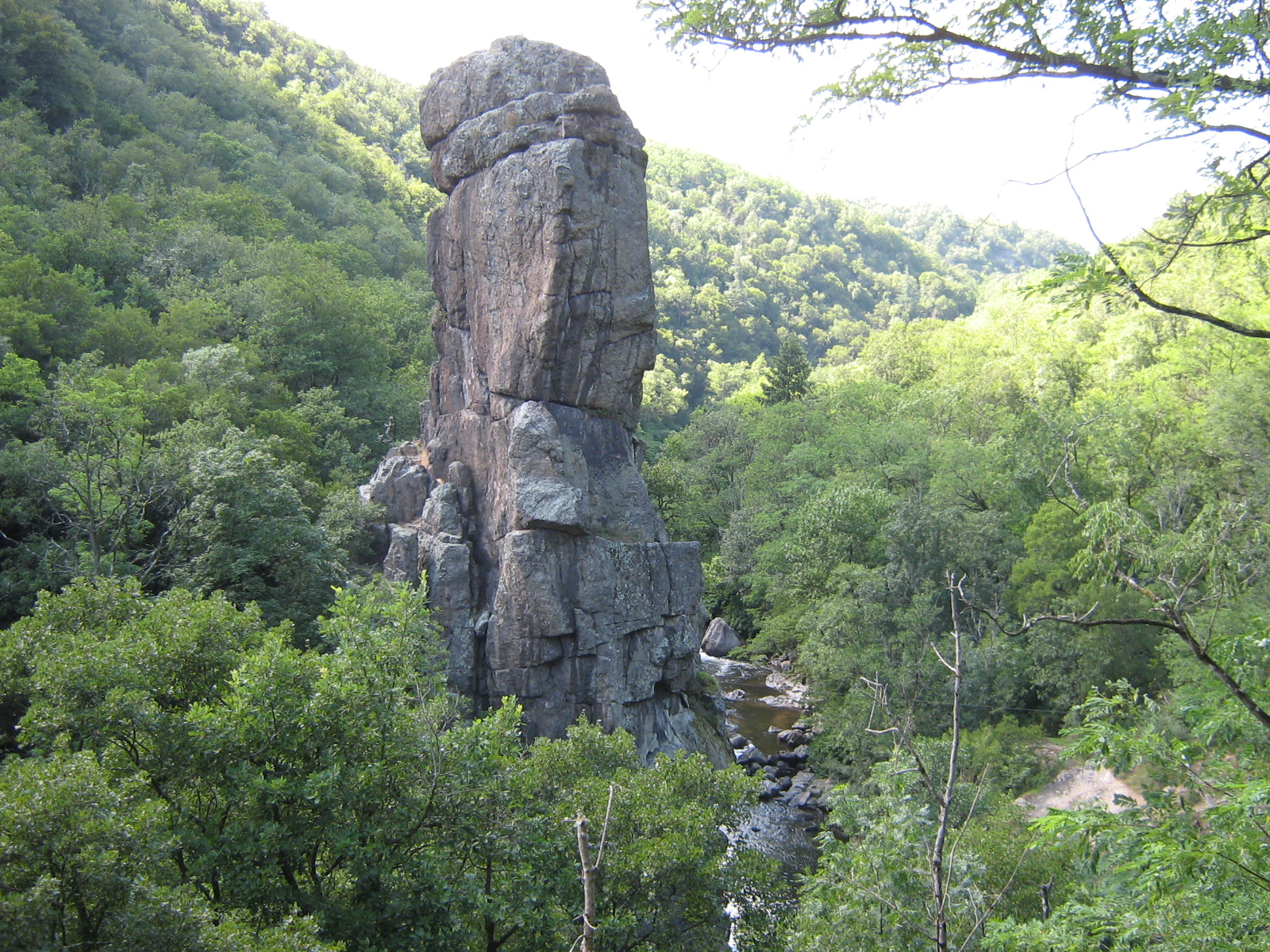
The Roche Péréandre formation in the Cance Valley, near Roiffieux

The department, corresponding to the ancient province of Vivarais, is part of the current region of Auvergne-Rhône-Alpes and is surrounded by the departments of Drôme, Vaucluse, Gard, Lozère, Haute-Loire, Loire and Isère. It is a land of great contrasts: at the lowest it is at a mere 40 metres of elevation above sea level at the point at which the Ardèche river flows into the Rhône (in the southeast of the department) up to 1,754 metres at Mont Mézenc (centre-west), it is bordered to the east by the length of the Rhône valley for 140 km and to the west by the high plateaus of the Massif Central.

At its widest, the department does not exceed 75 km. It covers an area of 5,550 square kilometres, a size that hides its great diversity in terms of relief, the absence of access to rapid transport (unique in France), and the difficulties in transport from one part of the Ardeche to another, especially in winter. Privas shares this inaccessibility, being by road 589 km from Paris, 574 km from Strasbourg, 215 km from Marseille, 211 km from Annecy, 162 km from Chambéry, 147 km from Nîmes, 140 km from Lyon, 135 km from Grenoble, and 127 km from Saint-Étienne.

=== Natural regions ===
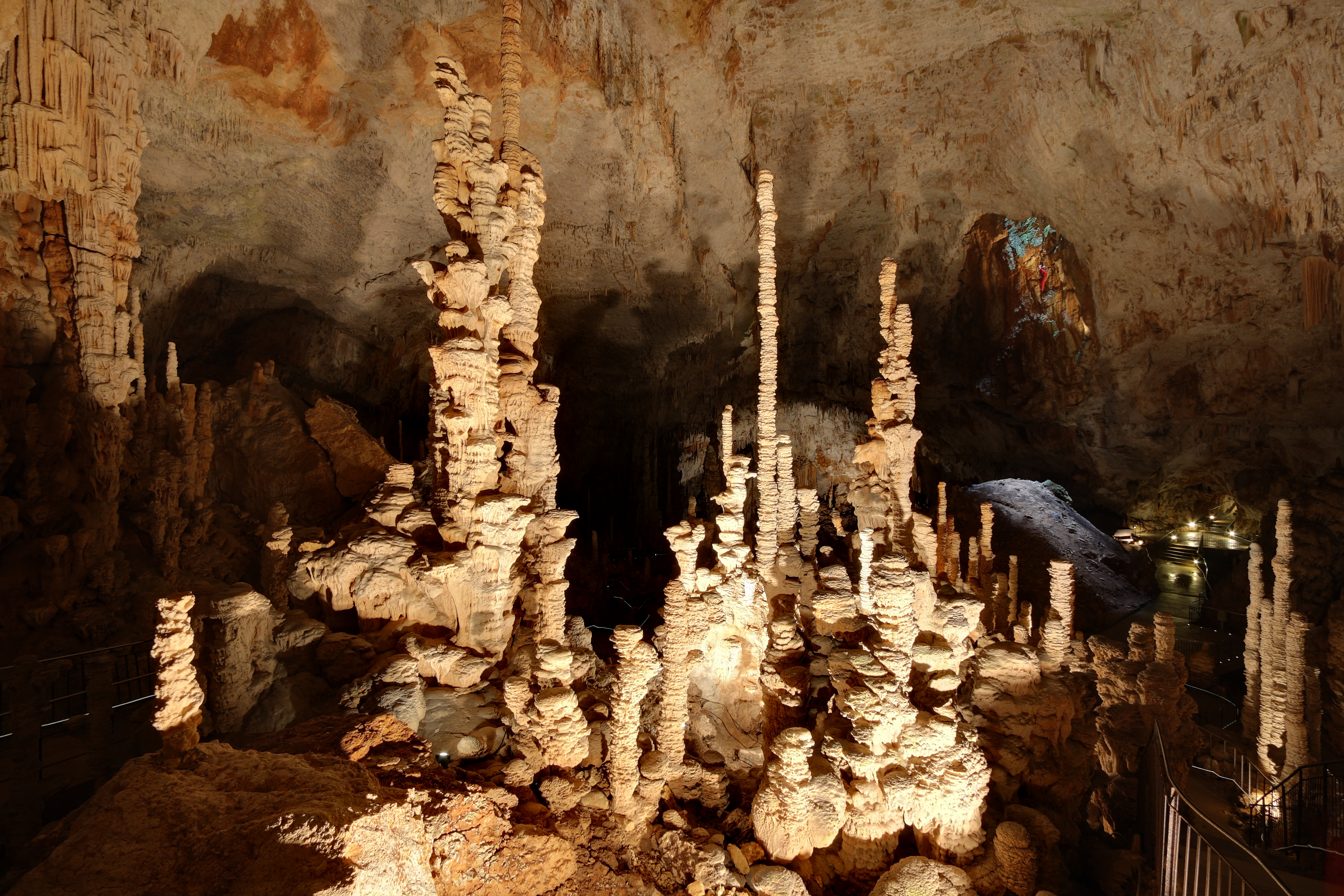
The Aven d'Orgnac, one of Ardèche's many protected caves

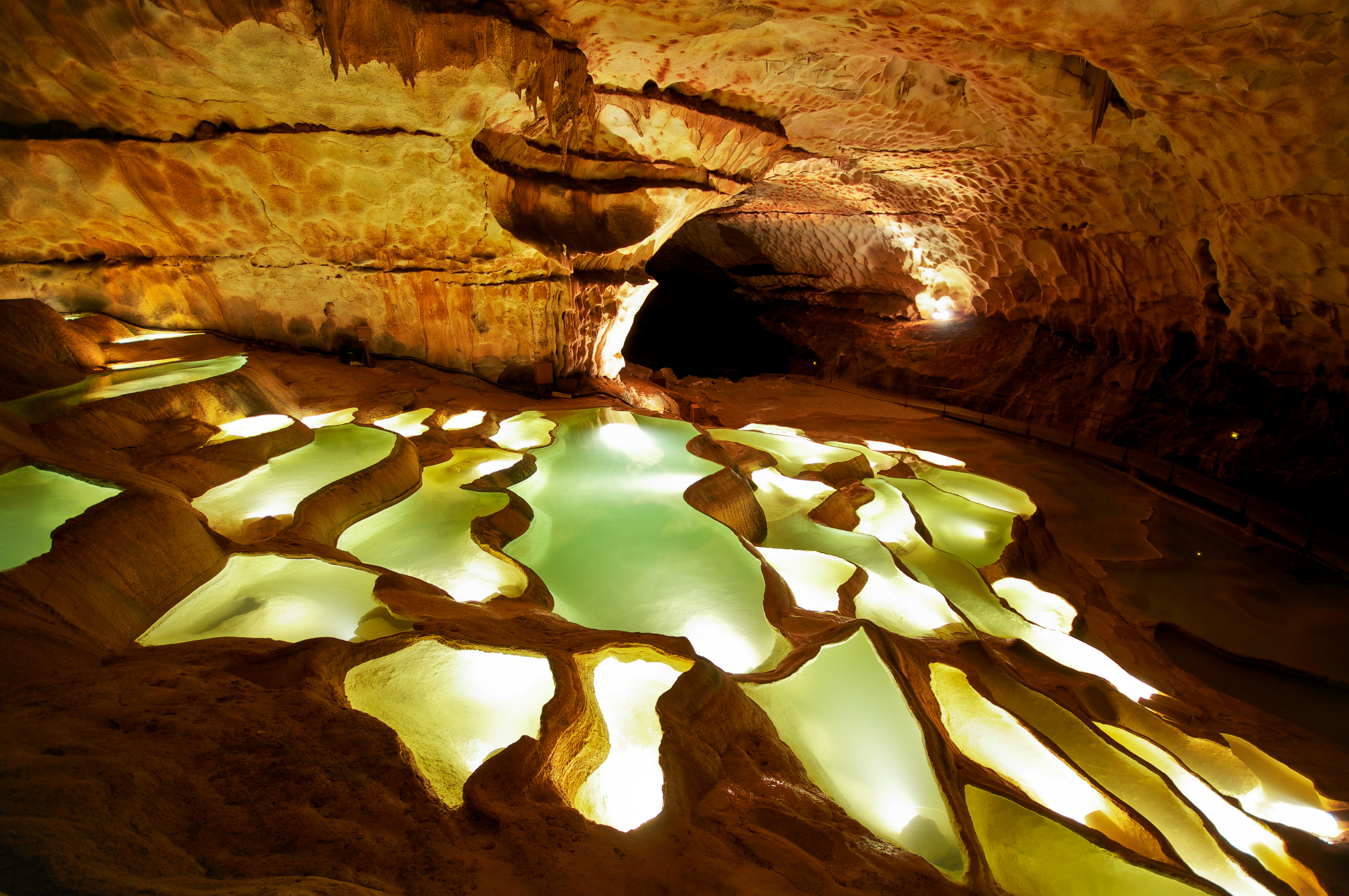
Rimstone formation in a cave near Saint-Marcel-d'Ardèche, France

The Ardèche encompasses five natural regions. Maps of different types of agricultural products translate clearly into these five regions. According to A. Siegfried, "The true character of the Ardèche is of a slope turning towards the Mediterranean, open to the influences coming from the Midi. These influences climb the length of the valleys to the summit of the high plateau, which resists their passage, not letting them penetrate. The high and the low are thus opposed, such is the character of the Ardèche personality."

==== Western mountains ====
The mountains that border the western frontier of the department have an average altitude of 1,100 metres. They are of largely granitic composition, split by the Velay Basalts of the Massif of Mézenc, and the Forez mountains, centred upon volcanic cones of ash, lava plugs and numerous magma flows (Mézenc: 1,754 metres; Gerbier de Jonc: 1,551 m). Their inclination slopes gently westward, leading to a westerly flow of water to the Atlantic. Here the Loire has its source. Within a few kilometres is the volcanic lake of Issarlès (92 ha, 5 km in circumference, 108 m in depth). The climate is extreme: snow for many months, very violent winds in autumn and winter (known locally as "la burle"), frequent fogs in the valleys, extreme temperature changes between the seasons, with heavy rains (1,500 mm per year in average) concentrated in September and October.

==== Plateaus of the Haut-Vivarais and the Cévennes ====
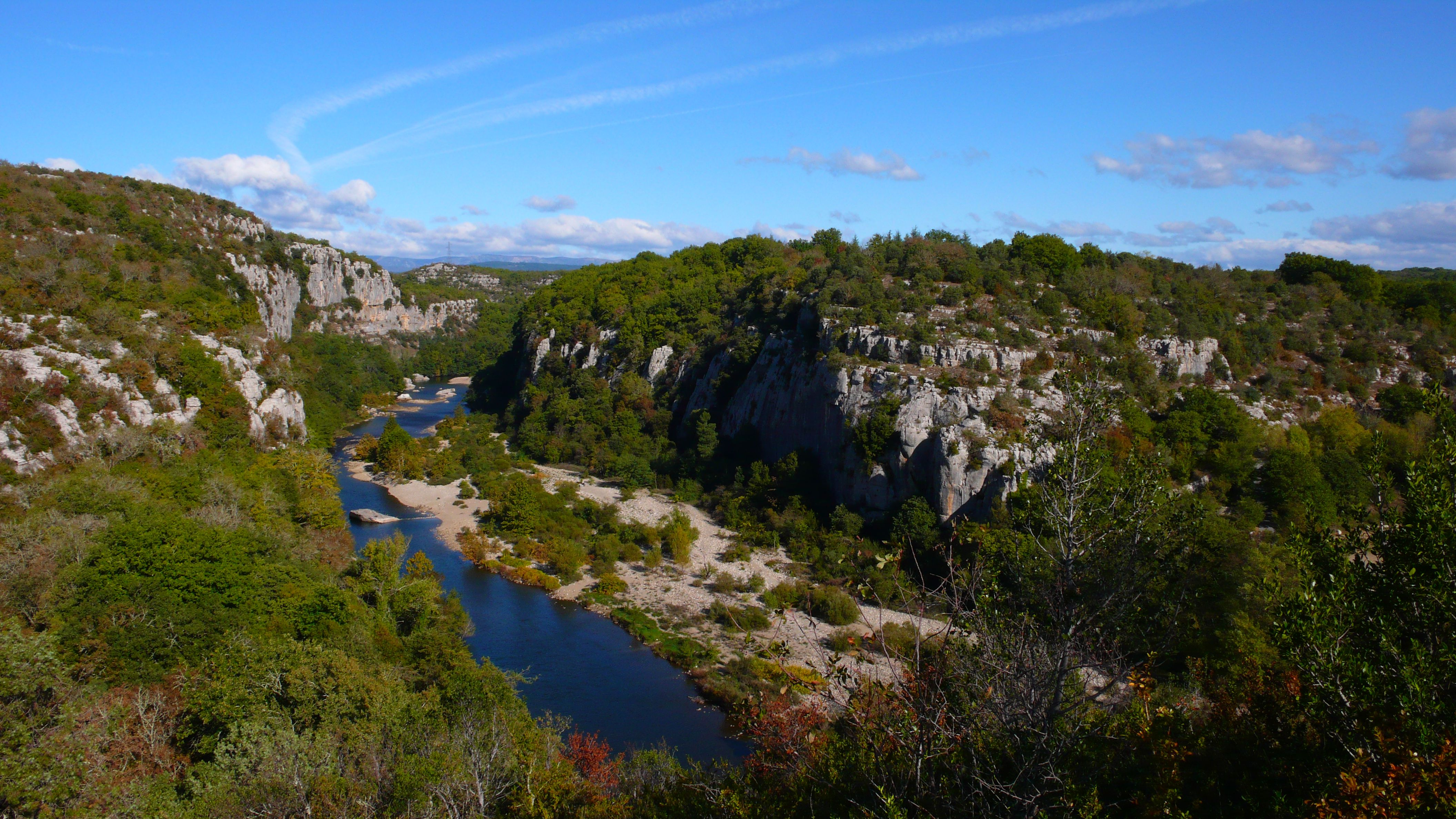
Gorges du Chassezac

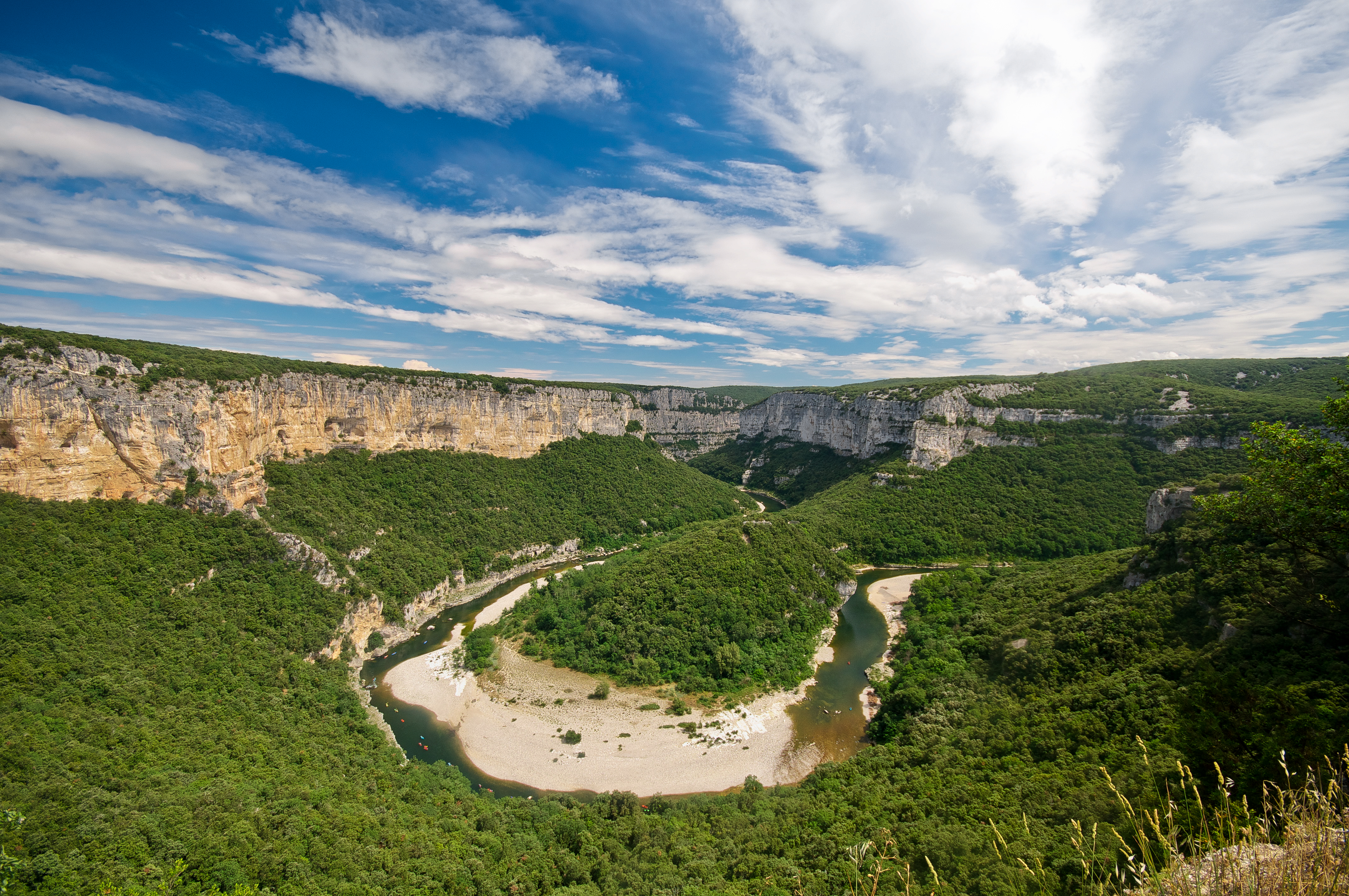
Cirque de la Madeleine, formed by the Ardèche River

The transition zone descending from the mountains (1,200 m) to the valley of the Rhône (300 to 400 m), is the plateau region. The plateau's medium altitude is one of green forested crests separated by wild and uncrossable gorges. Hydrographic resources are dominated by these torrential streams and rainfall is characterised by frequent summer showers, with the climate much less extreme than that of the mountains to the west.

==== Bas-Vivarais ====
The Ardèche river flows into the Rhône, following a generally southeasterly course. This Karst region is formed of calcareous limestones, where the streams flow in steep-sided valleys separated by sharp crests. With a generally low altitude the Bas-Vivarais enjoys a warm, dry, almost Mediterranean climate. Skies are wide and bright, temperatures more elevated (3 or 4 °C in January). The winds from the northeast are dominant, but those of the south (known as the "vent du midi") and west are full of humidity, bringing heavy precipitation for a few days at a time. The few rivers, the Lavezon, Escoutay, and Frayol, provide less of a hydrological resource than one sees in the crysaline granitic areas to the north. This is a country of wine, shrubland, cereals, and extensive fruit trees (this is the region of Aubenas and of Joyeuse).

==== Plateau of the Coirons ====
This plateau, 800 metres above sea level, is completely surrounded to the north by the valleys of the Ouvèze and the Payre, to the south by the valley of the Escoutay, and to the west by the Col of the Escrinet and the valley of Vesseaux. It is built of basalt that extends in length 18 km in the direction of the Rhône, and at its widest is a maximum 11 km. The climate here is also fairly extreme: snow, without being thick, is frequent, variations of temperature accentuated by the strong, cold winds. The soil is rich and fertile. Farming is dominated by wheat, oats, and potatoes, with the raising of goats and cattle. On the slopes are vines and fruit trees.

==== Valley of the Rhône ====
The Rhône corridor is very straight on the right bank, which runs almost at the foot of the Vivarais plateaus, leaving tiny plains where the rivers from the Vivarais descend to the Rhône. Here the strong north wind (the mistral) dominates, but temperatures are moderated by the influence of the "Midi" to the south. The narrow plains are very fertile and favourable to orchards (peaches and apricots). On the slopes the vines dominate.

=== Principal towns ===
The most populous commune is Annonay; the prefecture Privas is the sixth-most populous. As of 2023, there are 8 communes with more than 5,000 inhabitants:

Commune	Population (2023)
Annonay	17,274
Aubenas	12,416
Tournon-sur-Rhône	11,279
Guilherand-Granges	11,235
Le Teil	8,726
Privas	8,538
Bourg-Saint-Andéol	7,661
Saint-Péray	7,580

== Politics ==
=== Departmental Council of Ardèche ===
Arrondissement of Largentière in green, Privas in yellow, Tournon-sur-Rhône in blue

Ardèche is divided into three arrondissements. The President of the Departmental Council has been Olivier Amrane of The Republicans (LR) since 2021.

Party		Seats
•	Socialist Party	12
	The Republicans	6
	Miscellaneous right	5
•	Miscellaneous left	4
•	Radical Party of the Left	2
	New Centre	2
•	Citizen and Republican Movement	1
•	French Communist Party	1

=== Representation ===
==== National Assembly ====
Constituencies for members of the National Assembly: first constituency in green, second in orange, third in purple

Constituency	Member	Party
Ardèche's 1st constituency	Hervé Saulignac	Socialist Party
Ardèche's 2nd constituency	Vincent Trébuchet	Union of the Right for the Republic
Ardèche's 3rd constituency	Fabrice Brun	Miscellaneous right

==== Senate ====
Representing Ardèche in the Senate are Mathieu Darnaud (since 2014) and Anne Ventalon (since 2020), both of The Republicans.

== Demographics ==
Ardèche's inhabitants are called Ardéchois. Emigration from the Ardèche, one of France's poorer districts, long exceeded immigration, but this began to change in the mid-20th century. In 1990, Ardèche reached the population level it had 50 years earlier. Today the population numbers 334,231 (compared to 390,000 in 1861). There is net positive inward migration, but the rate of natural increase is negative.

Ardèche has few foreign-born immigrants, found almost exclusively in the tourist locations of Largentière, Le Pouzin, and Bourg-Saint-Andéol. They number about 11,000, 4% of the population. During the summer, many European tourists visit the Ardèche, principally Dutch and Germans staying at camping sites.

The following table shows population development in the Archèche since 1791.

Historical population

Year	Pop.	±% p.a.
1791	289,671	—
1801	266,656	−0.82%
1806	290,801	+1.75%
1821	304,339	+0.30%
1831	340,734	+1.14%
1841	364,416	+0.67%
1851	386,559	+0.59%
1861	388,529	+0.05%
1872	380,277	−0.19%
1881	376,867	−0.10%
1891	371,269	−0.15%
1901	353,564	−0.49%
1911	331,801	−0.63%
1921	294,308	−1.19%

Year	Pop.	±% p.a.
1931	282,911	−0.39%
1936	272,698	−0.73%
1946	254,598	−0.68%
1954	249,077	−0.27%
1962	248,516	−0.03%
1968	256,927	+0.56%
1975	257,065	+0.01%
1982	267,970	+0.60%
1990	277,581	+0.44%
1999	286,023	+0.33%
2007	309,456	+0.99%
2012	318,407	+0.57%
2017	325,712	+0.45%
2023	334,231	+0.43%

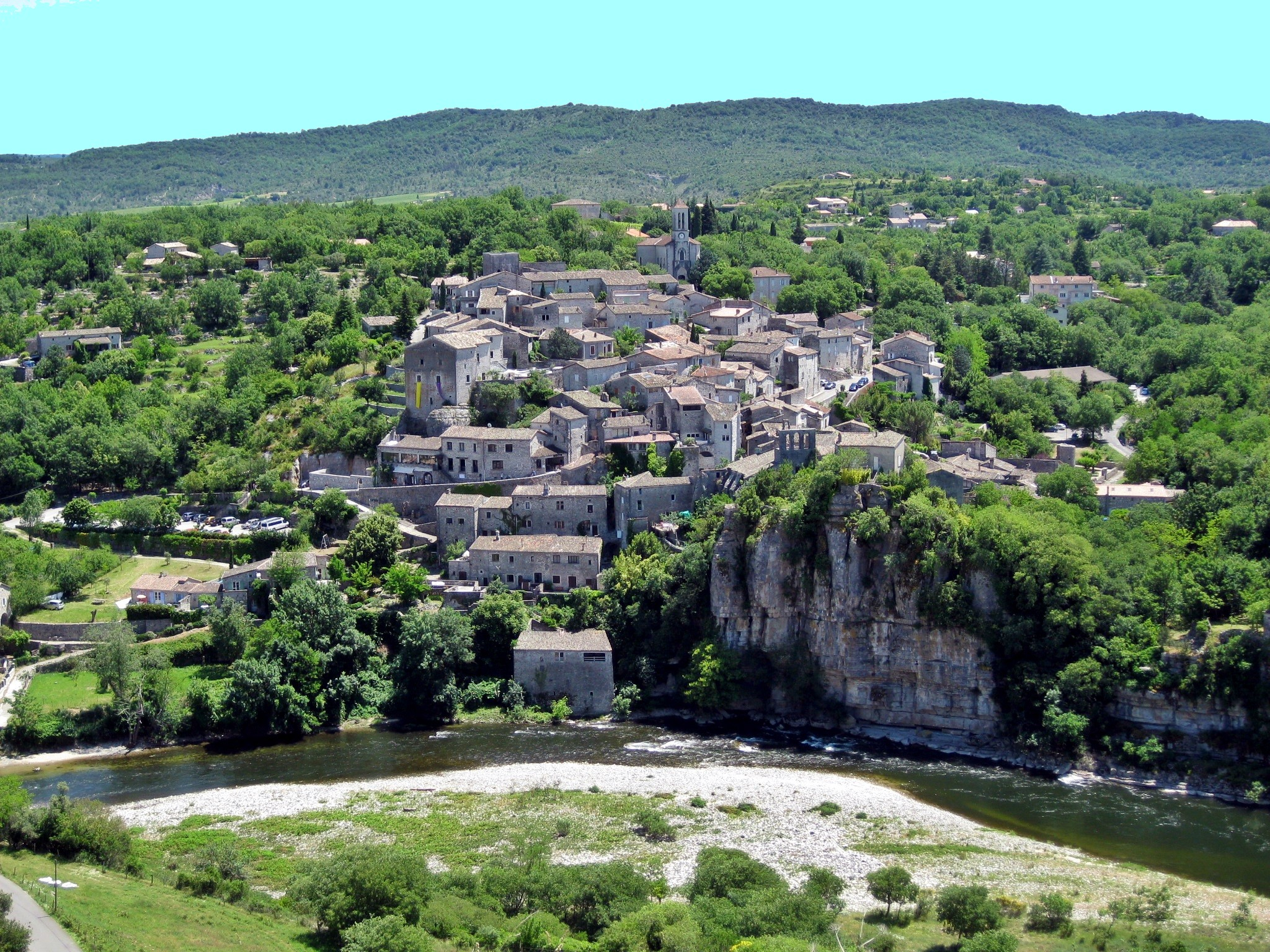
Balazuc (Latin: Baladunum) was founded circa 3000 BCE.

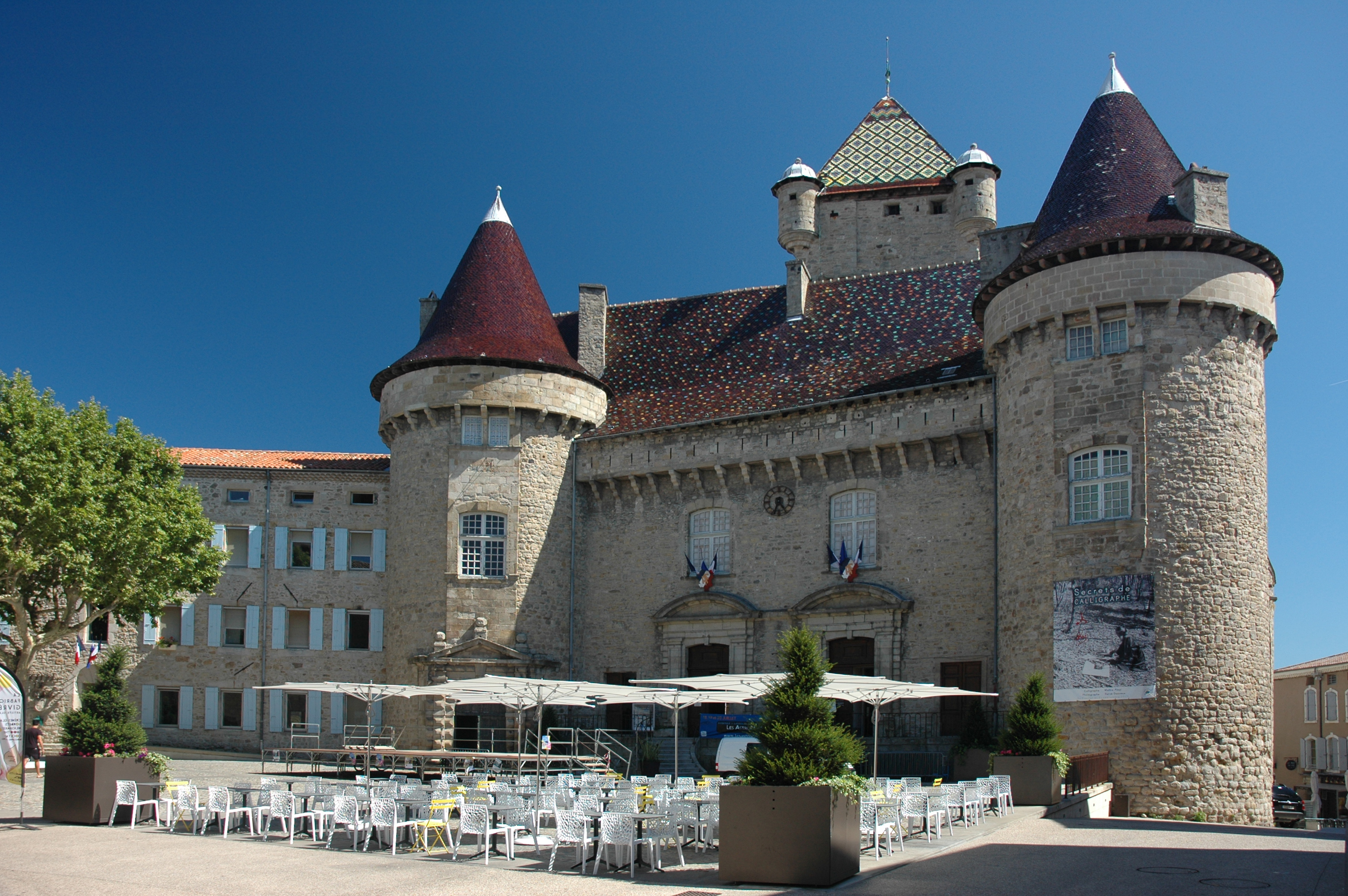
Construction of the Château d'Aubenas began in the 12th century.

Some 50% of the population of the department lives in rural communities, compared to a national average of 75% of the French population living in urban areas. The Ardèche has an average population density of 60 per km^{2}, compared to 121 per km^{2} in France. Population density is highest in the regions around the two towns of Annonay and Aubenas and along the edge of the Rhône valley. The mountainous areas are much less densely populated. As the mountains and the plateau continue to depopulate, those of the Rhône valley, Bas-Vivarais and lower Ardèche are continuing to grow, but the population situation, whilst better than in the past, still remains an issue for the region.

The Rhône valley and the Annonay region, close to the main axes of communication (highways and the TGV railway), are the department's most urbanised areas. Here the natural growth in population is everywhere positive. Annonay, Tournon-sur-Rhône, and Guilherand-Granges benefit from the proximity of the nearby town of Valence and the economically more advanced department of la Drôme. In the southern interior with the town of Aubenas and the valley of the Ardèche river, the population of the cantons of Villeneuve-de-Berg and of Vallon-Pont-d'Arc grows at four times the speed of the departmental average.

The high plateau and the mountainous areas as far as Privas continue to lose its young population (the median age of the population as a whole is increasing as a result of the weakness of the power of this region to attract new permanent inhabitants).

== Culture ==
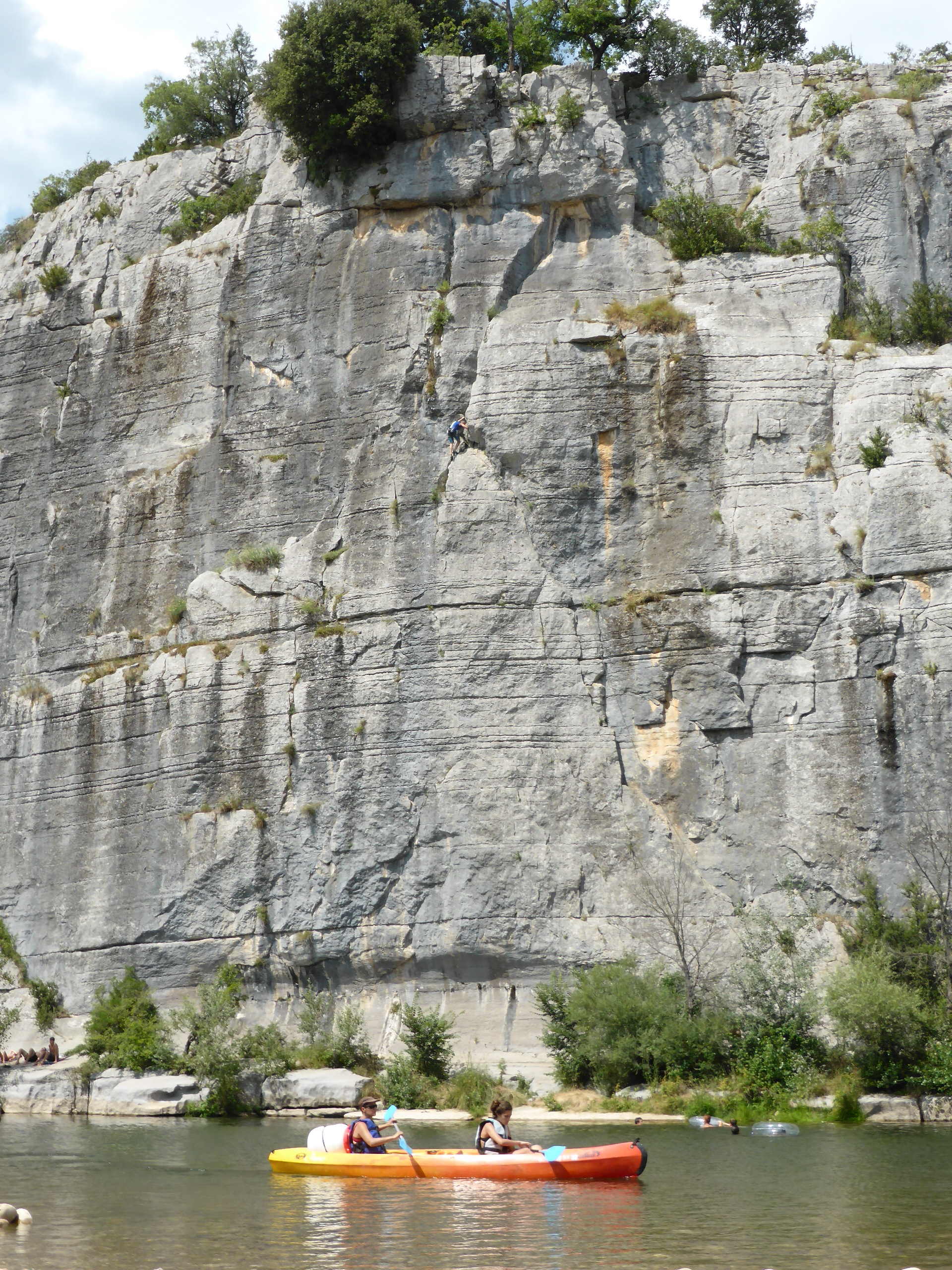
Canoeing in the valley of Chassezac

With its rivers and streams, Ardèche has become a favorite place for canoe and kayak enthusiasts from around the world. The Ardèche contains part of Cévennes National Park. The area is well known for sport climbing, with many well-managed limestone and granite crags. Each year the Ardeche hosts one of France's biggest road cycling events, L'Ardéchoise, with 16,000 entrants participating in 2011.

The Ardèche department is known for the speciality of Sweet Chestnuts, with the famous "châtaigne d'Ardèche" granted the appellation d'origine contrôlée (AOC) in 2006. The cuisine of Ardèche is very similar to that of Corsica, with liberal use of chestnuts.

== See also ==
- Cantons of the Ardèche department
- Communes of the Ardèche department
- Arrondissements of the Ardèche department
