= Value of in-force =

In life insurance, value of in-force is the present value of the profits that will emerge from a block of life insurance policies over time.

The value of in-force business is the present value of expected future earnings on in-force business less the present value cost of holding capital required to support the in-force business.
