= Canton of Guilherand-Granges =

Coordinates: 44.93°N 4.87°E

- Canton
- Situation of the canton of Guilherand-Granges in the department of Ardèche
- Country: France
- Region: Auvergne-Rhône-Alpes
- Department: Ardèche
- No. of communes: {{{nbcomm}}}
- Population (2023): 22,486
- INSEE code: 0707

The canton of Guilherand-Granges is an administrative division of the Ardèche department in southern France. It was created at the French canton reorganisation which came into effect in March 2015. Its seat is in Guilherand-Granges.

It consists of the following communes:

1. Châteaubourg
2. Cornas
3. Guilherand-Granges
4. Saint-Péray
5. Saint-Romain-de-Lerps
