= Archeological site of Alba-la-Romaine =

Coordinates: 44°33′39″N 4°36′04″E

The archaeological site of Alba-la-Romaine, corresponding to the Gallo-Roman city of Alba Augusta Helviorum or Alba Helviorum ("Alba of the Helvii") is located near the present town of Alba-la-Romaine. The site is in the French department of Ardèche, Rhône-Alpes. During the Roman Imperial era, Alba was the capital of the Celtic-speaking polity of Helvii, which had territory covering the area of lower Vivarais.

== History ==
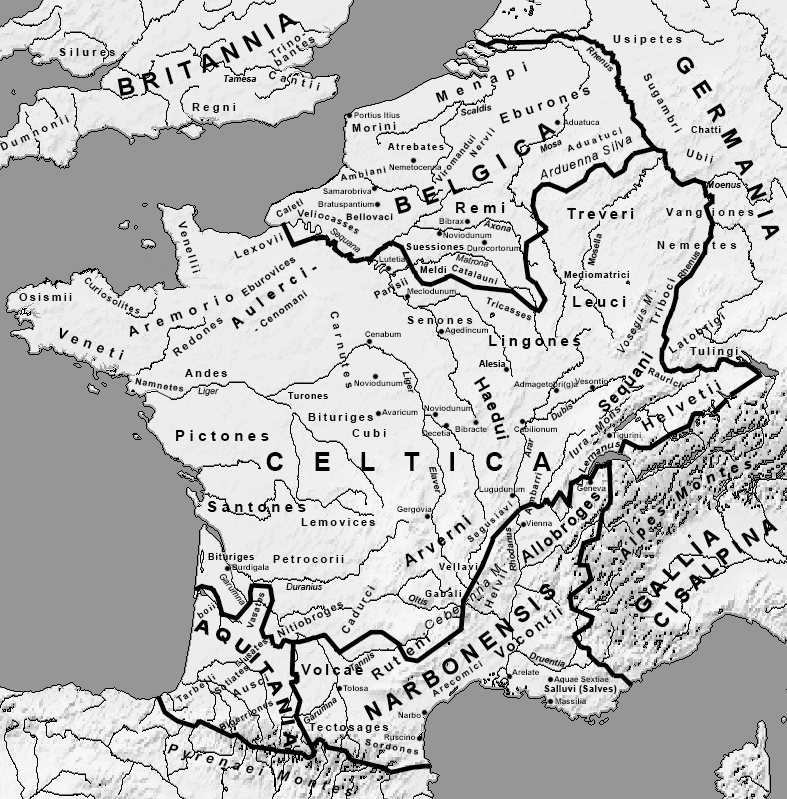
The civitates of Gaul, according to Caesar

A settlement is likely to have existed at the site of Alba before the civitas of the Helvii came under Roman rule, and there are indications of an early oppidum near the Chaulène plateau, northwest of Alba. The excavations west of the site ("Saint-Pierre") comes with lithic debris from the end of the third millennium. The existence of two Roman-style houses (domus) south-east of the site, inhabited in the first century BC (La Tène III), was revealed by the discovery of imported ceramics, as well as collars, handles, or lips of wine amphoras, and Italic and Allobrogian currency issued before the third quarter of the first century. Other oppida are known in the territory of Helvii, such as at Jastres North. Their neighbors to the north were the Segusiavi, to the west the Vellavi and Gabali, and to the south the Volcae Arecomici.

In 121 BC, the Arverni, a Celtic people from the Auvergne, were defeated by the Roman consul Fabius Maximus. Their king, Bituitos, was taken to Rome and paraded in a Roman triumph. Fabius Maximus managed to dissociate the Helvii and Allobroges from the Arverni, and drew them instead into an alliance with Rome. In 83 BC, the leader of the Helvii was granted Roman citizenship by the proconsul Gaius Valerius Flaccus, and incorporated his patron's name into his own, becoming Gaius Valerius Caburus. One of his two sons, Gaius Valerius Troucillus, was highly regarded by Caesar, and employed by him as an interpreter and diplomatic liaison during the Gallic Wars. In 52 BC, the Helvii held the border of the Roman province against an invasion of forces sent by Vercingetorix. Subsequently, Alba adopted privilege of Roman law.

Attached first to Gallia Aquitania, according to Strabo, the site was integrated into the Narbonnaise. "The starting point of Roman roads to Valencia, Lyon and Vienna by the bank of the Rhone, on the other hand to Bourg-Saint-Andéol and Narbonne, finally to Gergovie – excluding roads; center an agricultural region and especially viticulture centre of regional trade, Gaul, and even imperial (...), Alba is from the first century a major city", says Marcel Le Glay.

Christianity came to the region at the end of the first century, though the time the first episcopal see of the region was established is uncertain. After its decline and abandonment, probably at the end of the third century, the city was abandoned in the middle of the fourth century in favor of Viviers.

Against the wall of the Jewish cemetery in the northern district of Bonn, Germany is a relief of the gravestone of the first known inhabitants of Bonn. The tombstone inscription, translated from Latin, means:

Here lies Publius Clodius, son of Plubius, the region Voltinia born in Alba, the first legion soldier, aged 48, died after 25 years of service.

The ancient city, not counting its enclosure, spans thirty hectares and was bounded by the necropolis of Saint-Martin (first to second century AD) to the southeast and Saint-Pierre (second to fourth centuries AD) to the west. Its perimeter is estimated at four kilometres. No reliable estimation of the city's population is available.

== Archeology ==
=== North ward ===
The area that is now called Bagnols contains the first traces of settlement on the plain of Alba. The ancient city is part of the area and then spread to the place called the Palace of around monumental center.

North of the ancient city, as the city grows, is Gallo-Roman popular housing and a commercial property. From the first century AD, the allegiance of the Helvii to the emperor and complete integration into the Roman Empire is evidenced in the site. In 1992, a statue of a deified emperor was found. The site of the statue is connected to the center of the city by a monumental processional route. However, traces of abandonment and reuse of stones of the sanctuary are in evidence from the third century, an early sign of the abandonment of Roman ideals and living.

=== Monumental forum ===
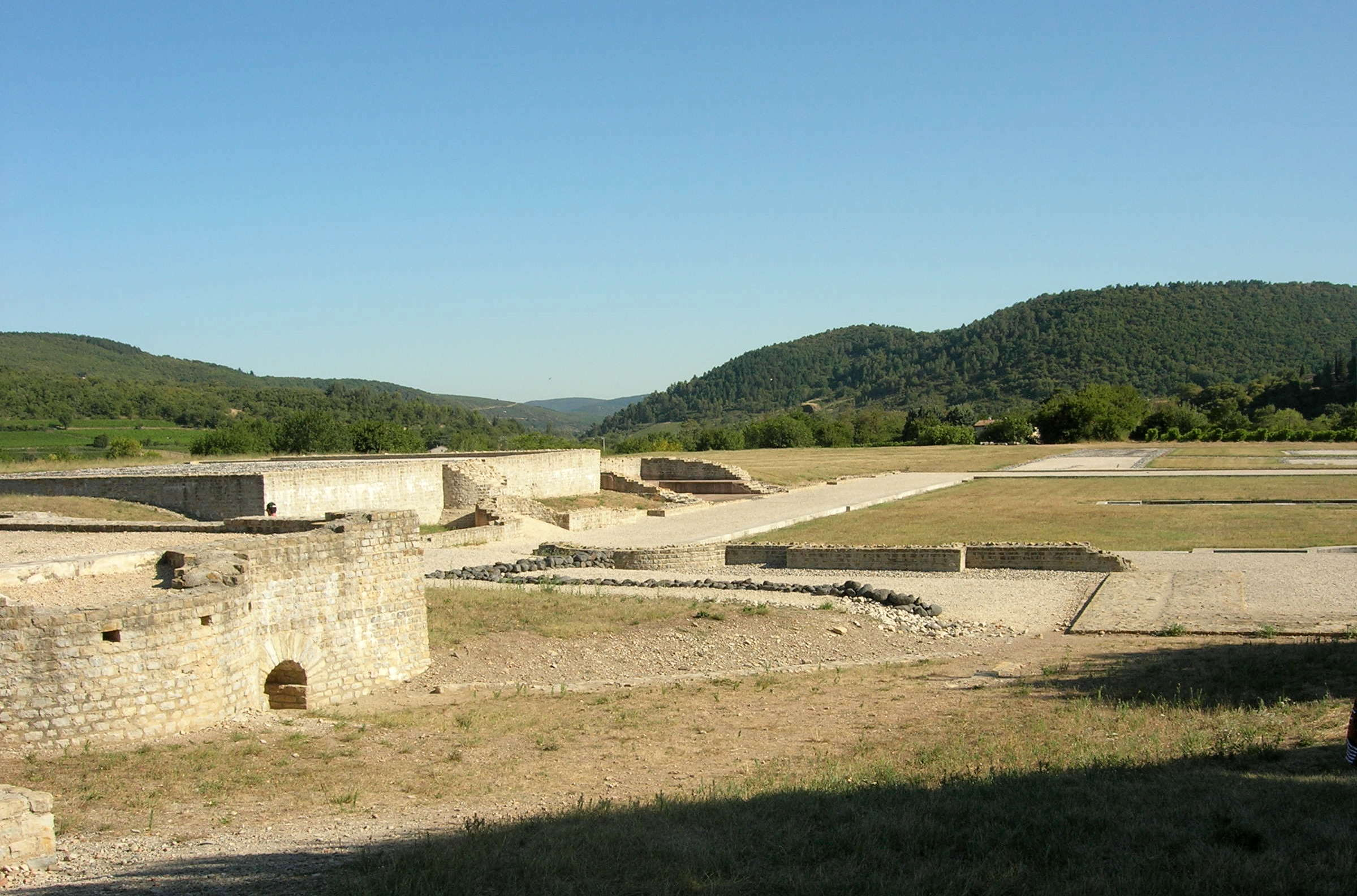
District Palace

On a forum dated to the second century, located at the top of the monumental center of the city, there was discovered a sarcophagus. On it are enumerated four drapers (centonarii), construction workers, boatmen (utriclarii, possibly more generally those involved in transport), and suppliers of wooden constructions (dendrophori), all of which seem related to the wine trade. The forum rests today in the vineyard, and has been identified through surveys during excavations.

In the north, a building serving the public consisting of four wings is built around a garden with two ponds. Its function is unclear.

In the south, the sacred space consists of two buildings built gantry in a row. The south portico, which contained neat decor (marble veneers, soft limestone columns, floor mosaic with geometric decoration), is a covered porch that opens onto a courtyard. A temple with vestibule (pronaos) and a large room (cella) is at the center of the court. South of the temple is a court and place of trade.

=== Hydraulic structures underground ===
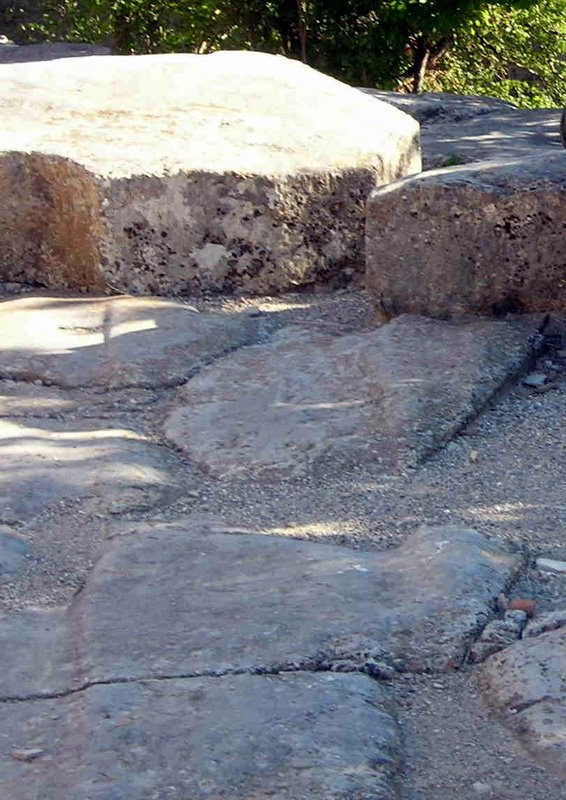
Paved Way

A complex network of pipes was discovered in 1966, forty metres south of the paved road. The main pipe from the creek bed runs first south and then turns at a right angle to the west. The construction is of marked quality. Small holes were drilled in the left wall of buildings in the city that allowed for water infiltration. On the right walls were arranged small secondary channels, ensuring water evacuation. On one pipe, there is an inscription dedicating the water supply to the individual responsible for its construction.

=== The theater ===
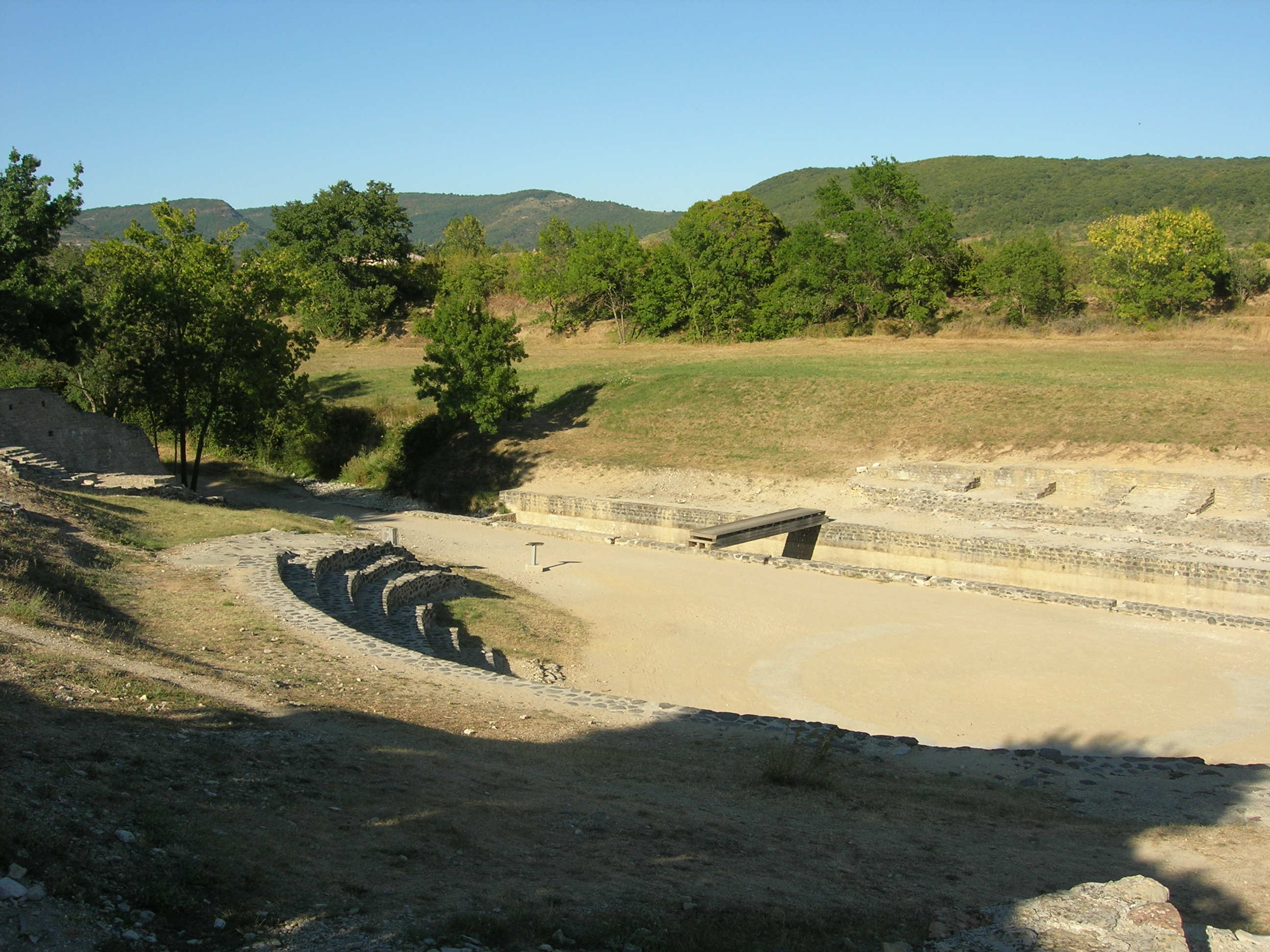
The theater

Southeast, a theater is crossed by the stream. Excavations have revealed that the development of the theatre was done in three stages. The oldest theater—made of bleachers, earth, and wooden boards—only occupies the right bank of the creek that found later channeled. It dates from the end of the first century. The first reconstruction was effected in 30-45 AD, and a second at the beginning of the second century.

On the right bank of the creek, four walls and semi-circular concentric bore the steps of the cavea seats reserved for spectators, only one remains. Could be accessed from the outside by vaulted passages (vomitoria). The orchestra which took place on seats of honor three rows of privileged spectators remain several large slabs semicircle. A long oblique wall, south of the theater, must have belonged to an important building. The scene was laid in the passage of the stream. On its left bank stood the stage wall and rear, an enclosed courtyard.

=== The private baths ===
South-west of the ancient city and the modern village entrance are spa, set infive rooms aligned from north to south. On the first level was a cloakroom (apodyterium), a basin with coated marble slabs, and a cold room (frigidarium). On the second level were three rooms (caldarium and tepidarium) between which the hot air circulated. Due to the size of the rooms, these spa have been suggested to be public baths. Coins were found in the peripheral rooms.

=== Basalts ===
The site and its sanctuary are less than a hundred meters north of the baths. It seems to be composed of buildings for agricultural or crafts and more modest dwellings.

=== Villas ===
Luxurious dwellings were discovered accidentally in 1967 in the south-east of the city, near to the river Escoutay, in a field. It is on this site that various objects (lamp oil, coins, and animal bones) were found. These remain the oldest fragments of amphorae and ceramics imported from Italy at the time the site was active. In the first house, there is a garden, dining room (triclinium), and a small room still partially provided with its hypocaust heating device.

The second house does not comply with the alignment of the street. It has yielded mosaics dated later than those of the first house, from the end of the second or early third century.

== Bibliography ==
- Docteur Jos Jullien et H. Muller, Recherches archéologiques sur l’emplacement de la ville romaine d’Alba Augusta Helviorum, Congrès d’Avignon- Rhodania,1946.
- Franck, Delarbre (1958). Alba Augusta Helviorum. Le Teil.
- Dupraz J., Carte archéologique de la Gaule. Ardèche, Académie des Inscriptions et Belles Lettres, juillet 2001 [Notice d'Alba, p. 97-194];
- Filhol C., Alba Helviorum, dans "Rhodania" congrès d'Aubenas et Vals-les-Bains, No. 1.243 et 1.245, 1927;
- Fraisse C. et Voisin A.-F.,Alba-la-Romaine une ville antique à son apogée, Association les Enfants et Amis d'Alba, 2004;
- Lauxerois Roger, Inscriptions d'Alba, dans "Rev. Arch. de Narbonnaise", 1974, p. 159-178;
- Lauxerois Roger et Vichy M., À propos des origines d'Alba Helviorum, dans "Gallia", 1975, p. 49-60;
- Lauxerois Roger, Alba la Romaine, première capitale du Vivarais, dans "Archéologia" No. 109, Dijon, août 1977, p. 18-25; ^{[primary]}
- Lauxerois Roger, Le Bas-Vivarais à l'époque romaine. Recherches sur la cité d'Alba, Paris 1983;
- Lauxerois Roger, André P. et Jourdan G., Alba, de la cité gallo-romaine au village, Guides archéologiques de la France No. 5, Paris 1985;
- Le Glay Marcel, Les fouilles d'Alba Augusta Helviorum, dans "Comptes-rendus de l'Académie des Inscriptions et Belles Lettres", 1964, p. 401-415;
- Le Glay Marcel, Autour des corporations d'Alba, dans "Bulletin de la Société Nationale des Antiquaires de France", 1964, p. 140-152;
- Le Glay Marcel, La reprise des fouilles d'Alba et les premiers résultats des recherches de 1964 et 1965, dans "Revue du Vivarais ", LXIX, 1965, p. 162-168;
- Le Glay Marcel et Tourrenc S., Le forum d'Alba Augusta Helviorum, dans "Hommages à Marcel Renard", III, Brussels, 1969, p. 346-359;
- Le Glay Marcel, directeur des Antiquités historiques de la région Rhône-Alpes, et Delarbre Franck, Alba Augusta Helviorum, Lyon, Société des Enfants et Amis d'Alba, 1960, rééditions: 1966, 1967, 1968, 1969, p. 24; ^{[primary]}
- Le Glay Marcel et Tourrenc S., Un curieux ouvrage hydraulique d'Alba Augusta Helviorum, dans "Hommage à Fernand Benoît", IV Bordighera, 1972, p. 131-141;
- Chanoine.j, Rouchier (1914). Histoire du Vivarais. Largentière. pp. 209–260.
- Alba la romaine. Sous les vignes, une ville antique, Centre de documentation archéologique, Alba-la-Romaine, sd (c. 1992); ^{[primary]}
- Alba la Romaine en Ardèche, Ministère de la culture et de la communication, Direction des Antiquités historiques de la Région Rhône-Alpes, sd. ^{[primary]}
