= Tattia gens =

Ancient Roman family

The gens Tattia was an obscure plebeian family at ancient Rome. Few members of this gens are mentioned in history, but others are known from inscriptions. The most illustrious was probably Gaius Tattius Maximus, an eques who rose to become praetorian prefect under Antoninus Pius.

== Origin ==
The nomen Tattius is thought to be of Sabine origin, and is listed by Chase among those gentilicia known to be Umbrian, Picentine, Sabine, or from southern Latium. This nomen must be distinguished from that of the Tatia gens, although, as both are thought to be Sabine, it is possible that they were originally the same. A number of the Tattii known from epigraphy lived among the Samnites, who claimed descent from the Sabines, and in various towns of Apulia and Lucania. Among the surnames of the Tattii are Vestinus and Paelinus, suggesting that they claimed descent from, or at least affinity with, the Vestini and Paeligni, Oscan-speaking peoples who fought against Rome during the Samnite Wars, and obtained Roman citizenship following the Social War.

== Praenomina ==
The Tattii used several common praenomina, particularly Marcus, Lucius, and Gaius, the three most abundant names throughout all periods of Roman history. Other names associated with this gens include Aulus, Publius, Quintus, and Titus, each of which was also common, as well as the Oscan praenomen Statius.

== Members ==
This list includes abbreviated praenomina. For an explanation of this practice, see filiation.

- Tattia C. l. Antemis, a freedwoman, is named alongside the freedmen Gaius Tattius Alexander and Gaius Tattius Capito in a sepulchral inscription from Sulmo in Samnium, dating from the middle of the first century BC.
- Gaius Tattius C. l. Capito, a freedman, is named along with the freedman Gaius Tattius Alexander and the freedwoman Tattia Antemis in a sepulchral inscription from Sulmo, dating from the mid-first century BC.
- Gaius Tattius C. l. Alexander, a freedman named along with the freedman Gaius Tattius Capito and the freedwoman Tattia Antemis in a sepulchral inscription from Sulmo, dating from the middle of the first century BC.
- Lucius Tatius T. f. Coxsa, one of the magistrates of Lavernae in Samnium, together with his colleagues, built a wall, gate, and a temple for the Bona Dea, commemorated in an inscription dating from the latter half of the first century BC.
- Tattia L. l. Dionysia, a freedwoman named in an inscription from Praeneste in Latium, dating from the first half of the first century, along with the freedman Lucius Tattius Epinicus.
- Lucius Tattius L. l. Epinicus, a freedman named in an inscription from Praeneste, dating from the first half of the first century, along with the freedwoman Tattia Dionysia.
- St. Tattius St. f. Paelinus, husband of the freedwoman Bennia Exoche, with whom he dedicated a first century tomb at Interpromium in Samnium for their daughter, Tattia Ionice.
- Tattia St. f. St. n. Ionice, a girl buried in a first-century tomb at Interpromium, aged seven years, eight months, with a monument from her parents, Statius Tattius Paelinus and Bennia Exoche.
- Tatia Ɔ. l. Salvia, the wife of Gavius Tertius and mother of Saturnina and Amaranthus Pyrallis, who dedicated a first-century monument to their parents at Peltuinum in Samnium.
- Tattia, the wife of Tiberius Claudius [...]cus, with whom she dedicated a tomb at Portus in Latium for their daughter, Tattia Te[...], dating from the reigns of Hadrian or Antoninus Pius.
- Tattia Ti. f. Te[...], daughter of Tiberius Claudius [...]cus and Tattia, who built a tomb for her at Portus during the reigns of Hadrian or Antoninus Pius.
- Quintus Tattius Vestinus, the son of Decumedus, was buried at Peltuinum, alongside his wife, Alledia Egloge, in a second-century tomb built by Ofanius Hyginus, who is identified as his brother.
- Gaius Tattius Maximus, a tribune of the equites during the mid-second century, he was prefect of the vigiles in 156, and subsequently praetorian prefect under the emperor Antoninus Pius.
- Tattia Hesperis, dedicated a monument at Numistro in Lucania to Tattia Marcella, dating between the middle of the second century and the middle of the third.
- Tattia Jucunda, buried at Volcei in Lucania, in a tomb dedicated by her daughter, Casinia Quartilla, dating between the middle of the second century and the middle of the third.
- Tattia Marcella, buried at Numistro, aged seventy-five, with a monument from Tattia Hesperis, dating between the middle of the second century and the middle of the third.
- Lucius Tattius Pelopianus, buried at Numistro, aged fifty, with a monument from his wife, Tattia Procula, dating between the middle of the second century and the middle of the third.
- Tattia Procula, dedicated a second- or third-century tomb at Numistro for her husband, Lucius Tattius Pelopianus.
- Marcus Tattius Fructianus, the husband of Tattia Prepusa, with whom he built a late second- or early third-century tomb at Atina in Lucania for their son, Marcus Tattius Fructanus.
- Tattia Laemotina, buried at Salona in Dalmatia, aged twenty-three, with a monument from Caetennia Amullina, dating between the middle of the second century and the end of the third.
- Marcus Tattius Fructianus, built a tomb at Atina for his wife, Fabia Zosima, dating from the late second or early third century.
- Marcus Tattius M. f. Fructianus, perhaps the same Fructianus as the husband of Fabia Zosima, was buried at Atina in the late second or early third century, with a monument erected by his parents, Marcus Tattius Fructianus and Tattia Prepusa.
- Marcus Tattius, mentioned in a third-century sepulchral inscription from Rome.

=== Undated Tattii ===
- Marcus Tattius Blandus, a potter whose maker's mark was found at Rome.
- Quintus Tattius P. f. Postimus, buried at Aquilonia in Samnium.
- Tattius Rogatianus, perhaps the son of Lucius Tattius Rogatus, donated to the cult of Saturn at the site of modern Talah, formerly part of Africa Proconsularis.
- Lucius Tattius Rogatus, buried at the site of Talah, aged eighty-five.
- Aulus Tatius Secundus, built a tomb at Rome for his wife, M[...] Hygia.
- Tattia V[...], named in a sepulchral inscription from Marruvium in Samnium.

== See also ==
- List of Roman gentes

== Bibliography ==
- Theodor Mommsen et alii, Corpus Inscriptionum Latinarum (The Body of Latin Inscriptions, abbreviated CIL), Berlin-Brandenburgische Akademie der Wissenschaften (1853–present).
- René Cagnat et alii, L'Année épigraphique (The Year in Epigraphy, abbreviated AE), Presses Universitaires de France (1888–present).
- George Davis Chase, "The Origin of Roman Praenomina", in Harvard Studies in Classical Philology, vol. VIII, pp. 103–184 (1897).
- Paul von Rohden, Elimar Klebs, & Hermann Dessau, Prosopographia Imperii Romani (The Prosopography of the Roman Empire, abbreviated PIR), Berlin (1898).
- Hilding Thylander, Inscriptions du port d'Ostie (Inscriptions from the Port of Ostia), Acta Instituti Romani Regni Sueciae, Lund (1952).
