= Helvii =

Gallic tribe

The Helvii (also Elui, ancient Greek Ἑλουοί) were a relatively small Celtic polity west of the Rhône river on the northern border of Gallia Narbonensis. Their territory was roughly equivalent to the Vivarais, in the modern French department of Ardèche. Alba Helviorum was their capital, possibly the Alba Augusta mentioned by Ptolemy, and usually identified with modern-day Alba-la-Romaine (earlier Aps). In the 5th century the capital seems to have been moved to Viviers.

From the mid-2nd to mid-1st century BC, Helvian territory was on the northern border of the Roman province of Gallia Transalpina (later the Narbonensis). As a border people, the Helvii played a crucial if limited role in the Gallic Wars under the leadership of Gaius Valerius Caburus, who had held Roman citizenship since 83 BC, and his sons Troucillus and Domnotaurus. Julius Caesar calls the Helvii a civitas, a polity with at least small-scale urban centers (oppida), and not a pagus ("sub-tribe").

== Name ==
They are mentioned as Helvii by Caesar (mid-1st c. BC), and as E̓louoì (Ἐλουοὶ) by Strabo (early 1st c. AD).

== Geography ==
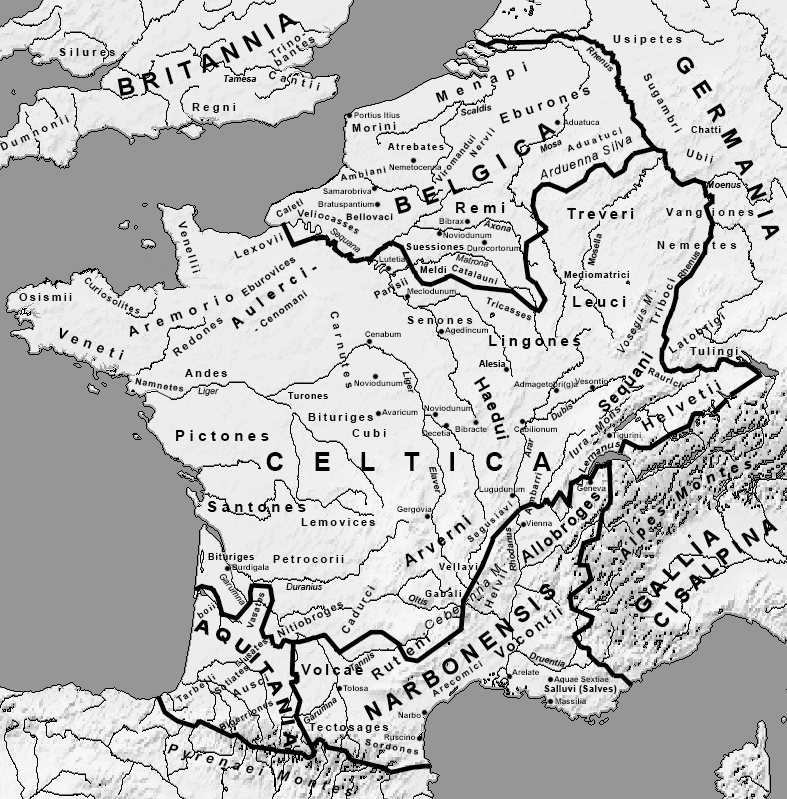
The Helvii were located on the northern border of the Narbonensis, southwest of the Allobroges and southeast of the Arverni

The source of the river Loire (Latin Liger) was located in Helvian territory, near their northern border along the crest of the Cévennes, where their lands were contiguous with those of the Gabali and the Vellavii; to the east, the Rhône offers a natural boundary, despite some indications that their holdings extended across the river.

The ridge between the rivers Ardèche and Cèze was likely their southern border, delimiting their territory from that of the Volcae Arecomici, though it is also possible that the Ardèche itself served this purpose. To the northeast, they were neighbors to the Segovellauni, separated perhaps by a ridge between the rivers Eyrieux and the Ouvèze.

== Roman politics ==
In the 70s BC, following the civil war between the faction of Sulla and the remnants of the supporters of Marius and Cinna, the Roman general Quintus Sertorius refused to yield Spain to the Sullan dictatorship. His secession sparked the Sertorian War, during which Celtic polities in Mediterranean Gaul were subjected to troop levies and forced requisitions to support the military efforts of Metellus Pius, Pompeius Magnus ("Pompey the Great"), and other Roman commanders against the rebels. Some Celts, including perhaps the Helvii and Volcae Arecomici, supported Sertorius. After the renegade Roman was assassinated, Metellus and Pompeius were able to declare a victory, and the Helvii and Volcae were forced to cede a portion of their lands to the Greek city-state Massilia (present-day Marseille), a loyal independent ally of Rome for centuries, located strategically at the mouth of the river Rhône and the staunch supporter of Pompeius.

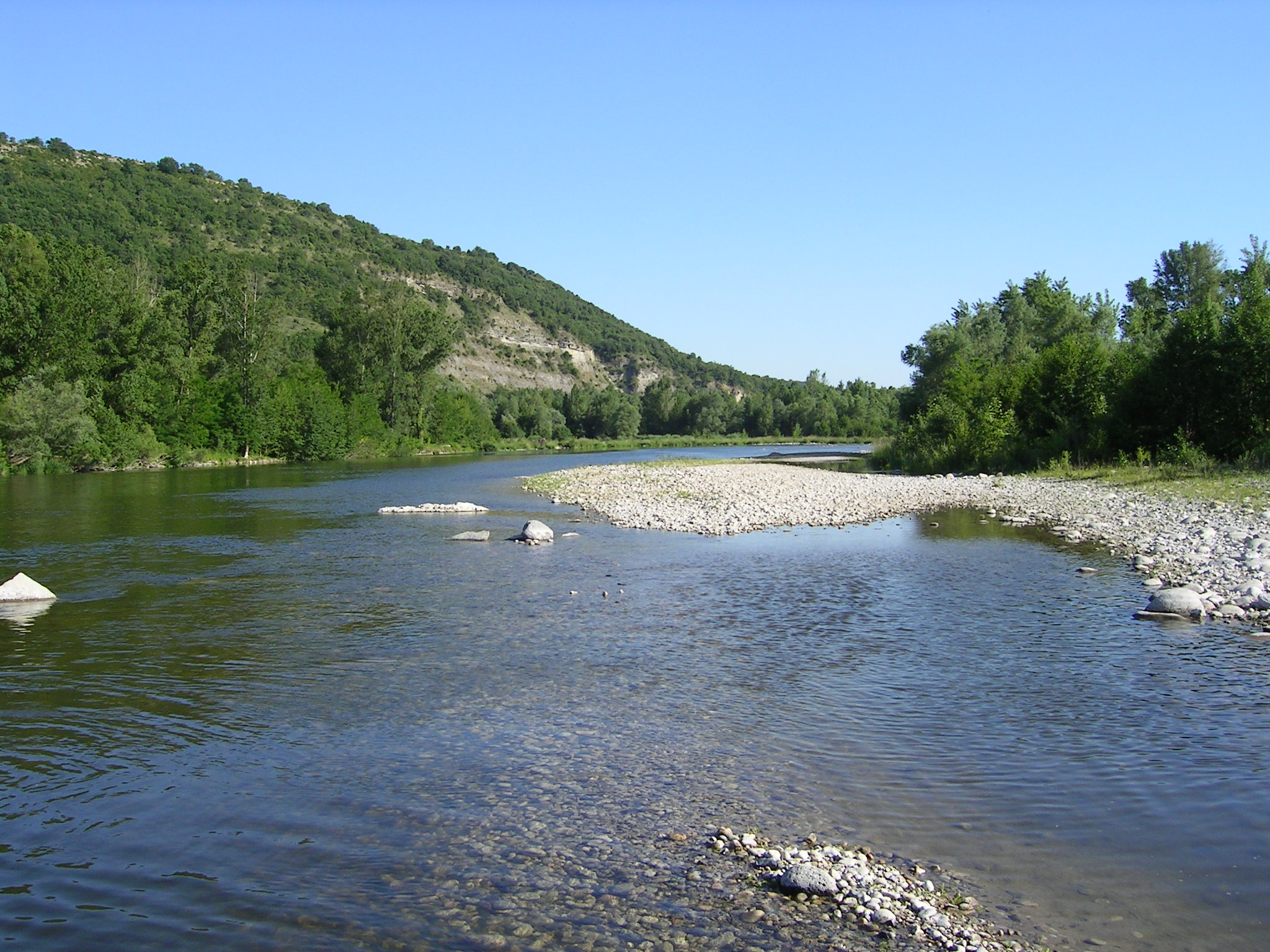
The Ardèche near Aubenas, within the ancient territory of the Helvii

During Caesar's Gallic Wars, none of the Gallic civitates within the Narbonese province joined the pan-Gallic rebellion of 52 BC, nor engaged in any reported acts of hostility against Roman forces. The Helvian Valerii, in fact, play a key role in securing Caesar's rear militarily against Vercingetorix, who sent forces to invade Helvian territory. In his 1861 history of the Vivarais, Abbé Rouchier conjectured that Caesar, seeing the strategic utility of Helvian territory on the border of the Roman province along a main route into central Gaul, cultivated the Valerii by redressing the punitive measures taken against them by Pompeius. Caesar mentions the land forfeiture in his Bellum Civile, while discreetly omitting any actions taken by his loyal Helvian friends against Rome in the 70s.

During the Roman civil wars of the 40s, Massilia chose to maintain its longstanding relationship with Pompeius even in isolation, as the Gallic polities of the Narbonensis continued to support Caesar. The Massiliots were besieged and defeated by Caesar, and as a result lost their independence, as well as the land, Caesar implies, that they had taken from the Helvii.

During his dictatorship, Caesar was criticized by political rivals for what were perceived as overly generous grants of citizenship to the Gauls and for admitting even "trouser-wearing Gauls" to the Roman Senate. These new Gallic senators were most likely from Cisalpine Gaul (northern Italy), which had become so Romanized that after 42 BC it was no longer assigned as a province and was administered by the same forms of municipal government as the rest of the Italian Peninsula (see Annexing Cisalpine Gaul). Ronald Syme, however, pointed out that a few Narbonese Gauls are known to have been highly educated, second-generation Roman citizens who were eminently qualified for senatorial rank. Among those named by Syme was the Helvian Gaius Valerius Troucillus.

== See also ==
- Archeological site of Alba-la-Romaine
