= Gaius Valerius Troucillus =

Ancient Roman diplomat

Gaius Valerius Troucillus or Procillus (fl. mid-1st century BC) was a Helvian Celt who served as an interpreter and envoy for Julius Caesar in the first year of the Gallic Wars. Troucillus was a second-generation Roman citizen, and is one of the few ethnic Celts who can be identified both as a citizen and by affiliation with a Celtic polity. His father, Caburus, and a brother are named in Book 7 of Caesar's Bellum Gallicum as defenders of Helvian territory against a force sent by Vercingetorix in 52 BC. Troucillus plays a role in two episodes from the first book of Caesar's war commentaries (58 BC), as an interpreter for the druid Diviciacus and as an envoy to the Suebian king Ariovistus, who accuses him of spying and has him thrown in chains.

Troucillus was an exact contemporary of two other notable Transalpine Gauls: the Vocontian father of the historian Pompeius Trogus, who was a high-level administrator on Caesar's staff; and Varro Atacinus, the earliest Transalpiner to acquire a literary reputation in Rome as a Latin poet. Their ability as well-educated men to rise in Roman society is evidence of early Gallo-Roman acculturation.

== Two names, one man? ==
Caesar first mentions Valerius Troucillus in Bellum Gallicum 1.19, when the Roman commander is made aware of questionable loyalties among the Celtic Aedui, Rome's allies in central Gaul since at least the 120s BC. Caesar represents this divided allegiance in the persons of two brothers, the druid Diviciacus, who had appeared before the Roman Senate a few years earlier to request aid against Germanic invaders, and the enterprising populist Dumnorix, who was the leading Aeduan in terms of wealth and military power. Dumnorix stood accused of conspiring with the enemy Helvetii; when Caesar holds a confidential discussion with his friend Diviciacus, he dismisses the usual interpreters and calls in Troucillus. Caesar describes Troucillus as a leading citizen of the province of Gallia Narbonensis and his personal friend (familiaris), adding that he placed the highest trust (fides) in the Helvian in all matters.

At Bellum Gallicum 1.46 and 52, Caesar names a Transalpine Gaul, this time according to the manuscripts as Gaius Valerius Procillus, whom he again calls his familiaris as well as his hospes. The hospes, sometimes translatable as a "family friend" and meaning "guest" or "host" in Latin interchangeably, is a participant in the mutual social relationship of hospitium, reciprocal guest-host hospitality. Caesar's use of the term may imply that he was a guest of the Helvian Valerii when he traveled through the Narbonensis, as he did to or from one of his two postings in Hispania during the 60s, or that the Helvian had been a guest of Caesar in Rome before the war. Most scholars assume that the two names refer to a single man; although Troucillus is a problematic reading of the text, it is a well-established Celtic name, whereas Procillus appears to have been confused with a Roman name. In this episode, Caesar sends Troucillus as a diplomatic envoy to the Suebian king Ariovistus, and again commends his linguistic skills and his fides, his loyalty or trustworthiness.

Caesar identifies Troucillus as an adulescens, a young man, generally in Caesarian usage between the ages of 20 and 30 and not having yet entered the political career track or held a formal command. The term is used elsewhere in the Bellum Gallicum for Publius Crassus and Decimus Brutus, who were born in the mid-80s.

== Princeps and legate ==
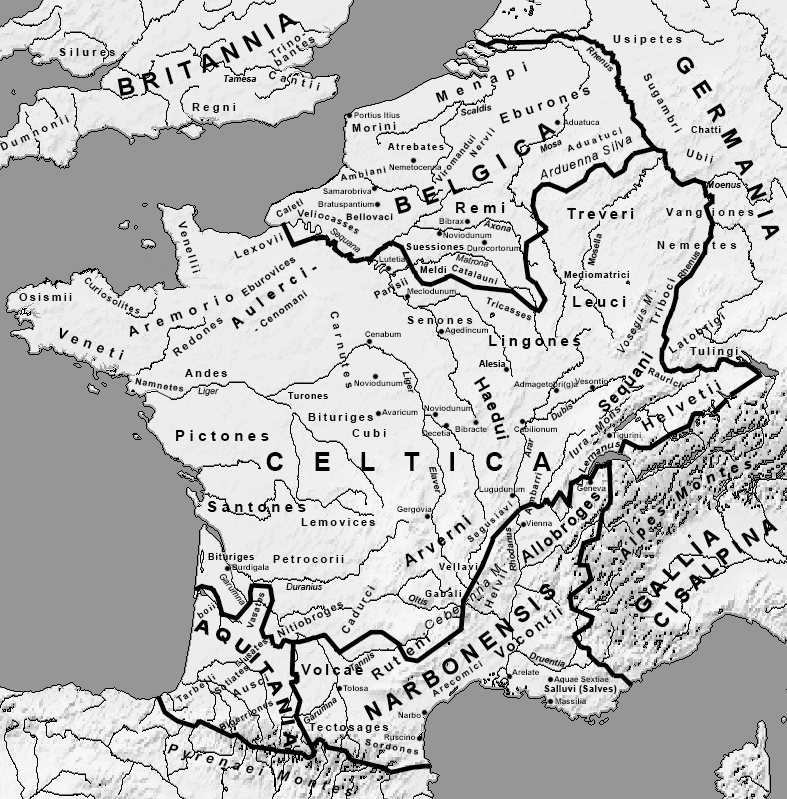
The Helvii were a small polity on the northern border of the Narbonensis, southeast of the Arverni

Caesar's identification of Troucillus's citizen status provides a piece of evidence for the history of Roman provincial administration in Gaul. Caesar notes that he is the son of Gaius Valerius Caburus, who was granted citizenship by G. Valerius Flaccus during his governorship in the 80s. Caburus took his patron's gentilic name, as was customary for naturalized citizens. Although Caburus's two sons retain a Celtic cognomen (personal name), by the third generation a member of such a family is likely to be using a more typically Roman name, and the Helvian Valerii cannot be identified further in the historical record.

The reference to Caburus's grant of citizenship in 83 BC helps date the term of Flaccus in his Transalpine province, and shows that Gauls were receiving Roman citizenship soon after annexation. As indicated by his closeness in age to Crassus and Brutus, Troucillus was born shortly before or after his father became a citizen, and was among the first Transalpiners to grow up with a dual Gallo-Roman identity.

Although no title or rank is given for Troucillus, Caesar calls him a princeps Galliae provinciae, "a leading citizen of the Province of Gaul". His father, Caburus, is called princeps civitatis of the Helvii, who are identified in this phrase not as a pagus, much less a "tribe" (Latin tribus), but as a civitas, a polity with at least small-scale urban centers (oppida). It has been argued that princeps denotes a particular office in the Narbonensis, but the word is usually taken to mean simply a "leader" or "leading citizen." Troucillus is listed among legates and envoys for 58 BC in Broughton's Magistrates of the Roman Republic. Erich S. Gruen notes the presence of Troucillus among those who demonstrate that Caesar favored men of non-Roman and equestrian origin among his junior officers and lieutenants. Ronald Syme calls the Helvian "a cultivated and admirable young man."

Troucillus was accompanied on the mission to Ariovistus by Marcus Mettius (or Metius), a Roman who had a formal social relationship (hospitium) with the Suebian king. Since Ariovistus had been declared a Friend of the Roman People (amicus populi romani) during Caesar's consulship in 59 BC, the hospitium between him and Mettius might have had to do with the diplomacy that led to the declaration of friendship; business dealings involving goods, slaves, or animals are also not out of the question. In 60 BC, the senate had sent three legates on a diplomatic mission to shore up relations to key Gallic civitates, including the Aedui, against the threatened invasion or inducements of the Helvetii, whose entry into Allobrogian and Aeduan territory two years later provided Caesar with a casus belli. One of these legates was Lucius Valerius Flaccus, the nephew of the Valerius Flaccus who had granted Caburus's citizenship. Lucius had served under his uncle in the Narbonensis at the beginning of his career. Because of their ties to the Valerii Flacci, Troucillus or another member of his family might have traveled with Flaccus as interpreter or liaison. Caesar explains his decision to send Troucillus to Ariovistus on linguistic grounds, saying that the Suebian king had learned to speak Celtic.

Despite Caesar's assertion that the king should have no cause to find fault with Troucillus, Ariovistus immediately accuses the pair of envoys of spying and refuses to allow them to speak. He has Troucillus thrown in chains. Such treatment of envoys was a violation of the ius gentium, the customary law of international relations, but it has been observed that Ariovistus's charge may not have been groundless.

Troucillus is held by the Suebi until the decisive battle, in which the Romans are victorious. Caesar gives the recovery of the young Celt an emphatic place in the penultimate paragraph of the book; several scholars have detected a degree of personal warmth in the passage that is atypical of the commentaries:

A 19th-century illustration depicting the chained Troucillus in the moment before his rescue by Julius Caesar

Caesar himself, while pursuing the enemy with his cavalry, happened upon C. Valerius Troucillus, bound in three chains and dragged along by guards during the rout. This event indeed brought Caesar a pleasure no less than the victory itself, because he saw the most worthy man of the Gallic province, both a personal and a social friend, snatched from the hands of the enemy and restored to him; fortune had not diminished any element of pleasure or thanksgiving by his loss. Troucillus told how three times, before his very eyes, they had cast lots to determine whether he should be burnt alive on the spot or whether to put it off for another time; thanks to the luck of the draw, he was unharmed. Marcus Metius likewise was recovered and brought to Caesar.

In his discussion of racial stereotyping among the Romans, A.N. Sherwin-White takes note of this passage in Caesar's overall depiction of Ariovistus as "an impossible person" who thought "nothing of frying an envoy." For reasons that are unclear, the Roman Mettius seems to have received better treatment during his captivity than did the Celtic envoy. The episode allows Caesar himself to display by contrast the aristocratic virtue of treating one's dependent friends well, which fosters obligations that enhance the important man's prestige.

=== Religious significance ===
H.R. Ellis Davidson views the casting of lots and proposed immolation of Troucillus as a form of human sacrifice in the context of Germanic religious practice. Both Celtic and Germanic peoples were said to practice human sacrifice, and it had been banned from Roman religious use by law only about forty years before the Gallic War. In his ethnography Germania, Tacitus notes that divination by means of lots was pervasive among the Germans, and records a rite of human sacrifice among the Semnones, "the most ancient and noble of the Suebi," that involves binding the participant in a chain; in his edition, J.B. Rives connects the practice to the incident involving Troucillus. Tacitus describes the use of twigs with markings in the casting of lots, and it has been suggested that these were used to cast the lots for Troucillus, with the markings an early form of runes. An 8th-century source says that the Germanic Frisians cast lots over a period of three days to determine the death penalty in cases of sacrilege, and the lots were cast three times for Troucillus; spying in the guise of diplomatic envoy would violate the sacred trust under the aegis of hospitium.

=== The Helvii and Roman politics ===
No polity within Caesar's Narbonese province joined the pan-Gallic rebellion of 52 BC, nor engaged in any known acts of hostility against Rome during the war. The family of Troucillus, in fact, plays a key role in securing Caesar's rear militarily against Vercingetorix, who sent forces to invade Helvian territory. In his 1861 history of the Vivarais, Abbé Rouchier conjectured that Caesar, seeing the strategic utility of Helvian territory on the border of the Roman province along a main route into central Gaul, was able to cultivate the Valerii by redressing punitive measures taken against the civitas by Pompeius Magnus ("Pompey the Great") in the 70s. During the secession of Quintus Sertorius in Spain, Celtic polities in Mediterranean Gaul were subjected to troop levies and forced requisitions to support the military efforts of Metellus Pius, Pompeius, and other Roman commanders against the rebels. Some Celts, however, supported Sertorius. After the renegade Roman was assassinated, Metellus and Pompeius were able to declare a victory, and the Helvii along with the Volcae Arecomici were forced to cede a portion of their lands to the Greek city-state Massilia (present-day Marseille), a loyal independent ally of Rome for centuries, located strategically at the mouth of the Rhône. Caesar mentions the land forfeiture in his account of the civil war, without detailing Helvian actions against Rome. During the Roman civil wars of the 40s, Massilia chose to maintain its longstanding relationship with Pompeius even in isolation, as the Gallic polities of the Narbonensis continued to support Caesar. The Massiliots were besieged and defeated by Caesar, and as a result lost their independence, as well as possibly the land they had taken from the Helvii. Rouchier presents an extended portrait of Troucillus in his history, viewing the educated young Celt through Caesar's eyes as an example of a visionary meritocracy in Rome.

== Humanitas, virtus and becoming Roman ==
During his dictatorship, Caesar extended full rights of Roman citizenship to ethnically Celtic Cisalpine Gaul (northern Italy), and filled the roll of the Roman Senate with controversial appointments that included Cisalpine and possibly a few Narbonese Gauls. Although accusations of degrading the senate with uncivilized "trouser-wearing Gauls" were exaggerations meant to disparage Caesar's inclusive efforts, Ronald Syme has pointed out that men such as Troucillus and Trogus were educated citizens worthy of such appointments:

Gallia Narbonensis can assert a peculiar and proper claim to be the home of trousered senators. No names are recorded. Yet surmise about origins and social standing may claim validity. The province could boast opulent and cultivated natives of dynastic families, Hellenized before they became Roman, whose citizenship, so far from being the recent gift of Caesar, went back to proconsuls a generation or two earlier.

Troucillus's fluent bilingualism is asserted by Caesar. The French scholar Christian Goudineau found it "perplexing" to have Caesar take special note that a native Gaul spoke Gaulish, and suggests that this emphasis on Troucillus's retention of what should have been his first language indicates that the Helvian had been given the same education as a Roman, perhaps even in Rome and maybe as a hostage.

Syme points out that the Gauls of the Provincia had direct exposure to the Greek language and to Hellenic culture through the regional influence of Massilia, which had well-established contact with the Helvii (see "The Helvii and Roman politics" above). The cultural and linguistic complexity of Mediterranean Gaul is asserted by Varro, who says Massilia is "trilingual, because they speak Greek, Latin, and Gaulish."

Caesar employs two abstract nouns from the Roman moral vocabulary to describe Troucillus: he is said to be outstanding for his humanitas and his virtus. Humanitas was "a keyword for late Republican elite self-definition"; it embraced a range of ideals including culture, civilization, education, and goodwill toward one's fellow human beings. Cicero considered humanitas to be one of Caesar's own outstanding qualities, and often pairs it with lepos, "charm"; in his speech arguing for the extension of Caesar's proconsular command, he distinguishes Roman culture from Gallic by mockingly asking whether "the culture and charm of those people and nations" could possibly be the attraction for Caesar, rather than the war's usefulness to the state (utilitas rei publicae). Cicero also associates humanitas with speaking well, the ability to hold a cultivated conversation free of vulgarity and to speak in an urbane manner.

A hundred and fifty years later, Tacitus takes a more cynical view of humanitas as an illusion of civilization that is in fact submission to the dominant culture. Tacitus observes that as governor of Roman Britain, Agricola had engaged in a program of

edifying the sons of chieftains by means of the liberal arts and promoting the natural abilities of the Britons over the intellectual achievements of the Gauls, so that now those who used to shun the Roman tongue craved eloquence. After that it was considered an honor to dress like us, and togas were everywhere. Little by little resistance melted in contact with vices — covered walkways and hot baths and fashionable dinner parties. And among the benighted this was called civilization (humanitas), although it was an aspect of slavery.

The Roman concept of humanitas as it took shape in the 1st century BC has been criticized from a postcolonial perspective as a form of imperialism, "a civilizing mission: it was Rome's destiny and duty to spread humanitas to other races, tempering barbarian practices and instituting the pax Romana."

The word humanitas appears only twice throughout the entirety of Caesar's Bellum Gallicum, both times in Book 1. In the famous opening, in which the commander parcels out Gaul into three divisions (Belgae ... Aquitani ... Celtae, 1.1.1) for potential conquest, Caesar reports that the Belgic Gauls are the bravest (fortissimi) fighters, "because they are at the farthest remove from the cultivation (cultus) and civilization (humanitas) of the Province." By contrast, Troucillus is said to possess the highest level of both humanitas and virtus. Virtus, which shares a semantic element with the Latin word vir, "man," is most commonly translated by either "virtue" or "courage, valor"; it is "the quality of manliness or manhood." As an active quality, appropriate to the man of action, virtus balances the potentially enervating effects of civilization in the natural aristocrat. Caesar's prolific use of the word virtus — fourteen instances in Book 1 alone, in reference to Celtic nations as a whole, and to the Roman army — points to "no easily articulated essential meaning": "Virtus was whatever it was that Romans liked when they saw it." Although the word appears frequently throughout the Bellum Gallicum, Caesar attributes the quality of virtus to only a few individuals: Troucillus; three Roman officers; and two Celts, Commius of the Atrebates and Tasgetius of the Carnutes.

=== The Bellum Gallicum audience ===
T.P. Wiseman saw the role of Troucillus in Bellum Gallicum 1 as one indication of the breadth of Caesar's intended audience. Wiseman argues that the commentaries were first published serially, with a year-by-year account to keep Caesar and his achievements vivid in the mind of the public (populus) on whose support he counted as a popularist leader. The seven individual books were then collected and supplemented by Aulus Hirtius at the end of the 50s or beginning of the 40s. "Publication" in ancient Rome relied less on the circulation of written copies than on public and private readings, which were an important form of entertainment; this circumstance, Wiseman intuits, goes a long way toward explaining Caesar's narrative use of the third person in regard to himself, since the audience would be hearing the words spoken by a reader. In addition to public relations efforts among the Roman people, Wiseman believes that Caesar would have sent readers to the Narbonensis, the Mediterranean region of Gaul already under Roman administration, because he required Narbonese support at his back if he was to succeed in independent Gaul.

The prominent attention given to the recovery of Troucillus from the Suebi at the end of Book 1, and the unusual warmth with which Caesar speaks of him, suggests that the proconsul valued his friends to the south and was careful to show it. In another indication of Narbonese regard for Caesar, the poet Varro Atacinus, the contemporary of Troucillus, wrote an epic poem called the Bellum Sequanicum (Sequanian War), no longer extant, about the first year of Caesar's war in Gaul.

== See also ==
- Archeological site of Alba-la-Romaine
