= Tatia gens =

Ancient Roman family

The gens Tatia was a minor plebeian family at ancient Rome. This gens is perhaps best known from the legendary figure of Titus Tatius, a Sabine king who fought against Romulus, and who subsequently became joint ruler of Rome. None of the Tatii held any of the higher magistracies of the Roman Republic, but a number are known from inscriptions.

== Origin ==
The Tatii claimed descent from Titus Tatius, a Sabine king, who after fighting Romulus to a standstill, agreed to joint rulership of the city. During this period, many Sabines settled at Rome, eventually making up a significant portion of the city's early populace. While Romulus and Titus Tatius are widely regarded as legendary figures whose historicity cannot be established, modern scholars agree that there was a large Sabine element in the early Roman population, from which the Tatii might have been descended.

== Praenomina ==
The main praenomina of the Tatii were Lucius, Marcus, Gaius, and Aulus, all of which were common throughout all periods of Roman history. A freedwoman of this gens bore the Faliscan praenomen Volta.

== Branches and cognomina ==
Inscriptions of the Tatii are found throughout central and southern Italy, from Umbria to Lucania. Besides Rome, the only place with a significant number of inscriptions from this family is Tarracina, in southern Latium. At least one family of this gens settled in Numidia. None of the Tatii known from epigraphy bear hereditary surnames; all of their cognomina seem to be personal names.

== Members ==
This list includes abbreviated praenomina. For an explanation of this practice, see filiation.

- Titus Tatius, the king of Cures in Sabinum, during the time of Romulus. According to legend, his army assaulted Rome following the Rape of the Sabine Women, and fought the Romans fiercely, until Hersilia and the Sabine wives of the Romans interceded, bringing about a truce between the two peoples. Tatius became joint ruler of Rome alongside Romulus. He was later slain in a riot at Lavinium, supposedly because he had insulted the ambassadors of Laurentum, a neighboring town.
- Lucius Tatius L. f., quaestor at Paestum in Lucania at some point in the latter half of the third century BC.
- Aulus Tatius M. l. Antiochus, a freedman and argentarius, or money-changer, buried at Fundi in Latium, along with Marcus Tatius, another freedman, according to an inscription dating between 88 and 78 BC.
- Marcus Tatius M. l., a freedman buried at Fundi between 88 and 78 BC, alongside the freedman Aulus Tatius Antiochus.
- Volta Tatia T. l., a freedwoman named in a sepulchral inscription from Carreum Potentia in Liguria, dating from the first century BC.
- Lucius Tatius L. f., named in a sepulchral inscription from Corfinium in Samnium, dating from the middle part of the first century BC.
- Gaius Tatius C. l. Bodorix, a freedman of Gaulish descent, buried at Mutina in Cisalpine Gaul, between the middle of the first century BC and the first quarter of the first century AD.
- Tatia Ɔ. l. Salvilla, a freedwoman named in an inscription from Rome, dating between the middle of the first century BC, and the middle of the first century AD.
- Tatia M. l. Philema, a freedwoman named in an inscription from Rome, dating from the early first century, along with the freedman Marcus Tatius Sabina, and others.
- Marcus Tatius M. l. Sabina, a freedman named in a first-century inscription from Rome, along with the freedwoman Tatia Philema. Sabina was deceased at the time of the inscription.
- Aulus Tatius A. f. Ampliatus, the husband of Silvia Apricula, a woman buried at Casilinum in Campania during the first half of the first century.
- Marcus Tatius M. l. Hilarus, a freedman buried at Tarracina in Latium during the first half of the first century, along with the freedmen Marcus Tatius Pusio and Marcus Tatius Menemachus.
- Tatia L. C. l. Isia, a freedwoman buried at Rome in a family sepulchre built by the freedman Publius Granius Philargurus, probably her husband, dating from the first half of the first century.
- Marcus Tatius M. l. Menemachus, a freedman buried at Tarracina during the first half of the first century, along with the freedmen Marcus Tatius Pusio and Marcus Tatius Hilarus.
- Marcus Tatius M. l. Pusio, a freedman buried at Tarracina during the first half of the first century, along with the freedmen Marcus Tatius Menemachus and Marcus Tatius Hilarus.
- Aulus Tatius, named in a first-century inscription from Herculaneum in Campania.
- Tatia Antiochis, the wife of Aulus Aemilius Primus, a freedman who built a first-century tomb at Tarracina for himself, his wife, their daughter, Tatia Prima, and others.
- Marcus Tatius Largus, one of the donors who contributed to a first-century statue at Tarracina.
- Tatia A. f. Prima, daughter of the freedman Aulus Aemilius Primus and Tatia Antiochis, buried in a first-century family sepulchre built by her father at Tarracina.
- Marcus Tatius M. f. Rufus, formerly a duumvir, buried at Tarracina, along with his wife, Vedia Tertulla, in a first-century tomb built by their son, Marcus Tatius Paetinus.
- Marcus Tatius M. f. M. n. Paetinus, dedicated a first-century tomb at Tarracina for his parents, Marcus Tatius Rufus and Vedia Tertulla.
- Lucius Tatius Ɔ. l. Philogenes, a freedman named in a first-century sepulchral inscription from Interamna Nahars in Umbria.
- Tatia Tyche, buried at Rome in a tomb built by her husband, Gaius Terentius Actius, dating some time between the accession of Nero and the death of Domitian.
- Tatia Baucylis, nurse to seven great-grandchildren of the emperor Vespasian, buried in a late first-century tomb at Rome.
- Marcus Tatius Naicus, buried at Rome in a tomb dedicated by his wife, Grania Atticilla, dating between the middle of the first century and the middle of the second.
- Gaius Tatius Epictetus, dedicated a second-century tomb at Rome for his brother, Stephanus, and his daughter, Flavia Urbica.
- Tatia Septim[...], dedicated a second-century tomb at Pagus Urbanus in Samnium for her daughter, Tatia Lea.
- Tatia Lea, a girl buried in a second-century tomb at Pagus Urbanus in Samnium, aged eleven years, six months, and twelve days, with a monument from her mother, Tatia Septim[...].
- Tatia Macrina, dedicated a second-century tomb at Alba Helviorum in Gallia Narbonensis to her son, Macrinus.
- Lucius Tatius Felix, buried at Cirta in Numidia, aged forty-five, in a tomb built by his wife, Sittia Maxima, dating from the late second or early third century.
- Tatia Fortunata, buried in a third-century sepulchre built by her husband at Rome.
- Tatia Ariste, buried in a fourth-century tomb at Rome.
- Tatius Eyticius, buried in a fourth-century tomb at Rome.

=== Undated Tatii ===
- Tatia, buried at Rome, aged twenty, in a tomb built by her husband.
- Tatia, the freedwoman of Charis, named in an inscription from Fundi in Latium, along with the freedwoman Tatia Andronica.
- Tatia, the wife of Publius Marius and mother of Gaius, who built a tomb for her at Brixia in Venetia and Histria out of the legacy provided to him in her will.
- Tatia, buried at Hispalis in Hispania Baetica, aged twenty-eight. Her monument describes her as dear to one Optatus, whose relationship to her is not recorded.
- Tatius, named in a sepulchral inscription from Mediolanum in Gallia Narbonensis.
- Tatius, mentioned in an inscription found at the site of modern Rimburg, formerly part of Germania Inferior.
- Tatius, placed a monument at the site of modern Pedraza, formerly part of Hispania Citerior.
- Gaius Tatius L. f., named in an inscription from Clusium in Etruria.
- Lucius Tatius, named in a sepulchral inscription from Rome.
- Gaius Tatius Albanus, dedicated a tomb at Fundi for his freedman, Fortunatus.
- Tatia M. l. Andronica, a freedwoman named in an inscription from Fundi, along with Tatia, the freedwoman of Charis.
- Lucius Tatius Capito, dedicated a tomb at Sigus in Numidia for his wife, Baebia Aristilla.
- Decimus Tatius D. l. Dionysius, a freedman named in a sepulchral inscription from Rome.
- Gaius Tatius Ger[...], named in an inscription from Rome.
- Tatia Januaria, named in a sepulchral inscription from Rome.
- Tatia L. f. Lucilla, a girl buried at Naeva in Hispania Baetica, aged five.
- Lucius Tatius L. f. Neptunalis, buried at Sigus.
- Tatia Rufina, an elderly woman buried at Rome, aged one hundred and six years, eleven months, and sixteen days, in a tomb built by her son.
- Tatius Sintrophus, named in a bronze inscription from Rome.
- Lucius Tatius L. l. Socr[...], a freedman named in an inscription from Altinum in Venetia and Histria.
- Marcus Tatius M. l. Tertius, a freedman named in an inscription from Fundi.
- Tatia Tharissa, buried at Thenae in Africa Proconsularis, along with another woman named Calpurnia Theoclia.

== See also ==
- List of Roman gentes

== Bibliography ==
- Dionysius of Halicarnassus, Romaike Archaiologia.
- Titus Livius (Livy), History of Rome.
- Lucius Mestrius Plutarchus (Plutarch), Lives of the Noble Greeks and Romans.
- Theodor Mommsen et alii, Corpus Inscriptionum Latinarum (The Body of Latin Inscriptions, abbreviated CIL), Berlin-Brandenburgische Akademie der Wissenschaften (1853–present).
- Giovanni Battista de Rossi, Inscriptiones Christianae Urbis Romanae Septimo Saeculo Antiquiores (Christian Inscriptions from Rome of the First Seven Centuries, abbreviated ICUR), Vatican Library, Rome (1857–1861, 1888).
- Bulletin Archéologique du Comité des Travaux Historiques et Scientifiques (Archaeological Bulletin of the Committee on Historic and Scientific Works, abbreviated BCTH), Imprimerie Nationale, Paris (1885–1973).
- René Cagnat et alii, L'Année épigraphique (The Year in Epigraphy, abbreviated AE), Presses Universitaires de France (1888–present).
- Stéphane Gsell, Inscriptions Latines de L'Algérie (Latin Inscriptions from Algeria), Edouard Champion, Paris (1922–present).
- Herbert Nesselhauf, "Neue Inschriften aus dem römischen Germanien und den angrenzenden Gebieten" (New Inscriptions from Roman Germania and Adjacent Areas), in Berichte der Römisch-Germanischen Kommission, vol. xxvii, pp. 51–134 (1937).
- Zeitschrift für Papyrologie und Epigraphik (Journal of Papyrology and Epigraphy, abbreviated ZPE), (1987).
- Hispania Epigraphica (Epigraphy of Spain), Madrid (1989–present).
- Maria Rosaria Coppola, Terracina. Il museo e le collezioni (Terracina: The Museum and the Collections), Rome (1989).
- Gabriël Cornelis Leonides Maria Bakkum (ed.), The Latin Dialect of the Ager Faliscus: 150 Years of Scholarship, Amsterdam (2009).
