= Château d'Alba-la-Romaine =

Castle in Alba-la-Romaine, France

Coordinates: 44°33′18.5″N 4°35′57.5″E

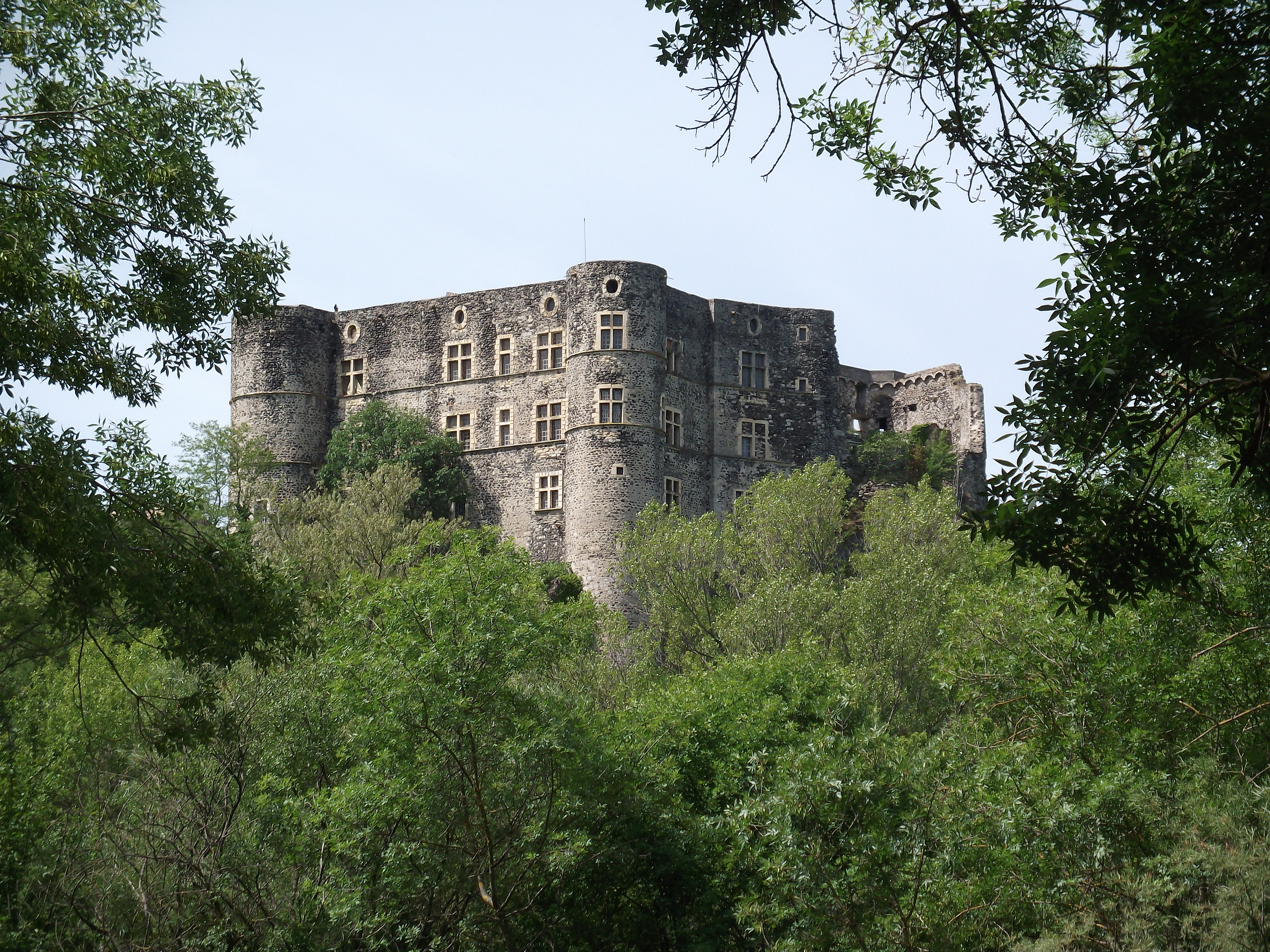
Château d'Alba-la-Romaine

The Château d'Alba-la-Romaine (French pronunciation: [ʃɑto dalba la ʁɔmɛn]) is a château in Alba-la-Romaine, Ardèche, in southeast France.

Built in the 12th century and reworked during the Renaissance, the castle today functions as a museum and concert hall. The castle has been listed as a monument historique since 1939 by the Ministry of Culture.

== History ==
The first iteration of the château, a keep, was built in the 12th century by the Aps family, of which little is known. By 1284, the castle was passed to the Adhémar family, and under their guidance an additional wing was added. From 1779 through 1793, the palace was repeatedly raided by nearby townsmen in response to the extravagance of the Montagut family, who inhabited the château at the time. At the dawn of the Reign of Terror in 1793, the Montaguts fled the political violence in France, and the property was split into seven plots and sold off.

It was only in 1880 that a local man named Dr. Galliard started making moves to reunite the property. He and his successors restored the castle, and eventually opened it to the public as an exhibition centre and tourist locale.
