= Gaius Valerius Caburus =

1st-century BC leader of the Helvii

Gaius Valerius Caburus (fl. 1st century BC) was a leader of the Helvii, a relatively small Celtic polity whose territory was more or less equivalent to the Vivarais (the French department Ardèche), on the northern border of Gallia Transalpina. Caburus was granted Roman citizenship in 83 BC by Gaius Valerius Flaccus during his governorship of Gaul. The date of his last known activity indicates that he was probably between the ages of twenty and thirty at the time, and almost certainly under thirty-five. Caburus took his patron's gentilic name, as was customary for naturalized citizens.

It was exceedingly rare in the early 1st century BC for an ethnic Celt born outside the Italian Peninsula to hold Roman citizenship. Caburus's service must have been of great value during a politically turbulent time; see discussion of Flaccus's governorship and his position during the civil wars of the 80s.

Caburus's loyalty to Rome was long-lived, as was his prominence among his people. During the 50s BC, he actively supported Julius Caesar in the Gallic Wars. He last appears in the historical record in 52 BC as a leader of the Helvii, more than thirty years after becoming a Roman citizen. This longevity, coupled with the rare grant of citizenship, suggests that Caburus was a person of exceptional political acuity and leadership qualities.

Caburus had two known sons, Troucillus (or Procillus), who played a diplomatic role on Caesar's staff in 58 BC, and Domnotaurus (in Celtic probably Donnotarvos), who died while defending Helvian territory against a force of Arverni and Gabali sent by Vercingetorix.

== Etymology of name ==
A Celtic origin for the name Caburus has sometimes been disputed, but it may derive from cabo, "mouth."

== See also ==
- Archeological site of Alba-la-Romaine
