= Marcel Le Glay =

French historian and archaeologist (1920–1992)

Marcel Le Glay (7 May 1920, Arleux near Douai (Nord) – 14 August 1992) was a 20th-century French historian and archaeologist, specializing in ancient Rome. His work focused in particular on Roman religion and North Africa during Antiquity, especially from Latin literature epigraphic: his monumental thesis, dedicated to the cult of Saturn in Africa, is meeting his three favorite areas.

== Career ==
A member of the École française de Rome from 1947 to 1949, he chose to devote himself to archeology, with a thesis on the Roman porticos and religious history, with an article on Syrian gods of the Janiculum where he already addressed the issue of integration of provincial cults in the Roman religious universe.

The work of Marcel Le Glay is important: a dozen books, and nearly two hundred articles and pamphlets, of which approximately half relates to ancient Africa. His culture, intellectual curiosity, competence were very broad and covered all of Roman history.

He also devoted many studies to Gaul, and the Byzantine Empire often caught his attention. Throughout his career he managed to combine his research and scientific responsibilities with his university professor functions.

== Publications ==
- 1952: Cherchell, antique lol-Caesarea (reprint and update of the book by St. Gsell, in coll. with E.-S. Colozier), Algiers, 126 p.
- 1956: Les Religions orientales dans l'Afrique ancienne from the collections of Musée St. Gsell d'Alger, Algiers, 38 p.
- 1957: La Sculpture antique from the collections of Musée St. Gsell d'Alger, Algiers, 45 p.
- 1958: Les Portraits antiques du Musée St. Gsell d'Alger according to the ancient sculptures and coins (in coll. with J. Mazard), Algiers, 58 p.
- 1960: Alba Augusta Heluiorum (in coll. with F. Delarbre),
- 1962: Les Gaulois en Afrique, Brussels, Collection Latomus, 44 p.
- 1961: Saturne africain, Monuments, Paris, 2 vol., 1961, 464 p. and 1966, 366 p.
- 1966: Saturne africain, Histoire, Befar, Paris, 522 p.
- 1977: Les Gallo-romains, dans Histoire de la France, directed by Georges Duby, Paris, t. 1, p. 108-145.
- 1970: Saint-Romain-en-Gal, quartier urbain de Vienne gallo-romaine, Lyon, 33 p.
- 1972: La Religion romaine, Paris, 352 p..
- 1975: La Gaule romanisée in Histoire de la France rurale, published under the direction of Georges Duby and A. Wallon, Paris, p. 191-285.
- 1976: Notes d'épigraphie et d'archéologie lyonnaises (in coll. with A. Audin), Paris, 84 p.
- 1985: Turris Libisonis colonia lulia (in coll. with A. Boninu and A. Mastino), Sassari, 127 p.
- 1986: Villes, temples et sanctuaires de l'Orient romain, Paris, 1986, 330 p.
- 1987: L'Empire romain, (in coll. with J. Le Gall), Paris, 1987, 673 p.
- 1989: Rome, grandeur et déclin de la République, Paris, 401 p.
- 1991: Histoire romaine, (in coll. with Yann Le Bohec and J.-L. Voisin), Paris
- 1992: Rome, grandeur et chute de l'Empire, Paris, 581 p.

== Sources and bibliography ==
- Claude Lepelley, B.C.T.H.S (Bulletin du Comité des travaux historiques et scientifiques), Afrique du Nord, fasc. 23, 1990-1992 (1994), p. 25-32.
- Yann Le Bohec and Jean-Louis Voisin, Mélanges Le Glay, L'Afrique, la Gaule, la religion à l'époque romaine, Coll. Latomus, 1994, p. 29-30.

=== External links ===
- Cent ans d'Année épigraphique
- Bibliographie et notice nécrologique. Archived from the original 19 June 2015
- Marcel Le Glay on the site of the Académie française
