= Arecomici =

Gallic tribe

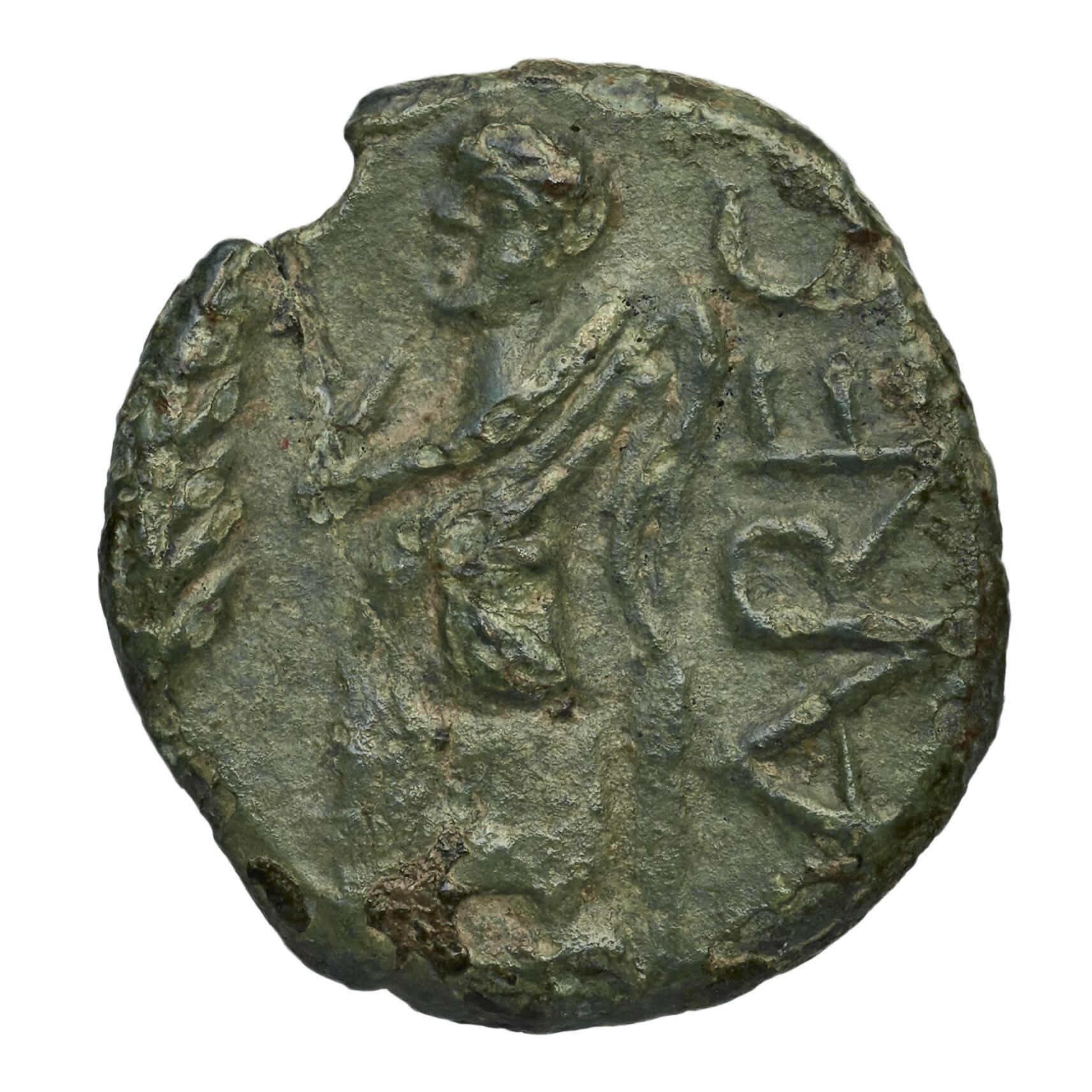
Bronze coin with the abbreviated name of the Arecomici

The Arecomici or Volcae Arecomici were a Gallic tribe dwelling between the Rhône and the Hérault rivers, around present-day Nîmes, during the Iron Age and the Roman period.

== Name ==
The meaning of the ethnonym Arecomici remains unclear. The Gaulish prefix are- means 'in front of, in the vicinity of', but the translation of the second element, -comici, is unknown. The name Volcae stems from Gaulish uolcos ('hawk').

== Geography ==
Their chief town Nemausus was inhabited since the Bronze Age; its original pre-Celtic name was likely forgotten after the takeover of the settlement by the Celtic Volcae.

Another settlement was known as Vindomagus ('white market').

== History ==
The Arecomici were probably first recognized or defined as a political entity by Rome around 75 BC. According to anthropologist Michael Dietler, the Roman colonization of the region, which led to the organization of Nemausus as a colonia Latina in the late 1st century AD, "resulted in the ethnogenesis of the Volcae Arecomici out of a formerly fluid coalition of different polities and ethnic groups".

They were indeed part of a political confederation encompassing multiple smaller tribes. By the early first century AD, the Volcae Arecomici were the dominant force of the confederation, ruling over twenty-four subject towns (oppida ignobilia) from their capital Nemausus.

== Economy ==
The Roman conquest was soon followed up by the first emissions of coins in Nemausus. Coins with the legend 'Volcae Arecomici' (AR/VOLC or VOLC/AREC) are dated to 70 BC.
