= Aubignas =

- Commune
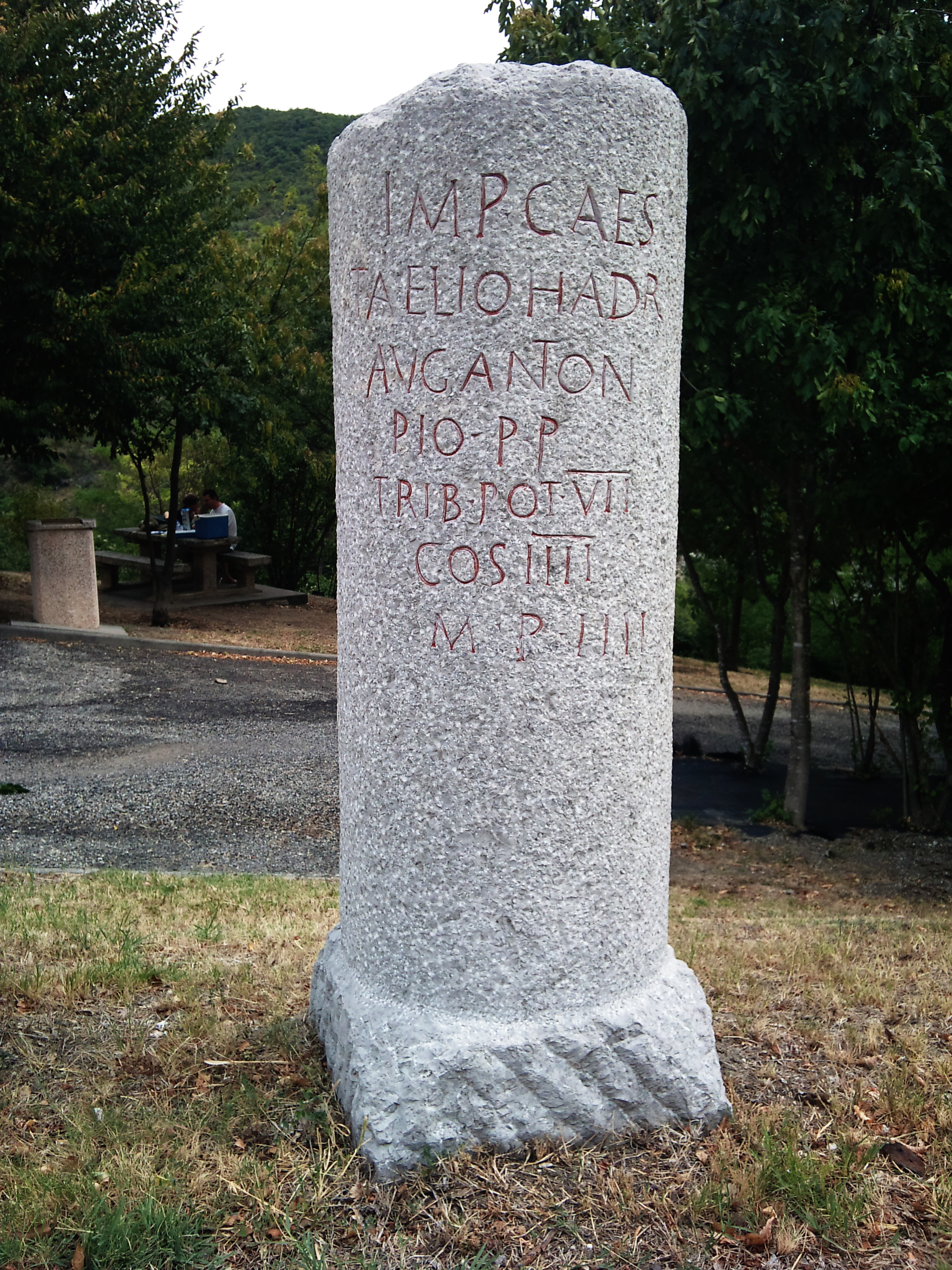
- Limestone replica of a Roman milestone CIL 17-02, 183 at Le Teil

- Coat of arms
- Location of Aubignas
- Location within France Location within Auvergne-Rhône-Alpes
- Coordinates: 44°35′21″N 4°38′04″E
- Country: France
- Region: Auvergne-Rhône-Alpes
- Department: Ardèche
- Arrondissement: Privas
- Canton: Berg-Helvie
- Intercommunality: CC Ardèche Rhône Coiron

Government
  - Mayor (2020–2026): Serge Villard
- Area^{1}: 15.42 km^{2} (5.95 sq mi)
- Elevation: 300 m (980 ft)
- Highest elevation: 664 m (2,178 ft)
- Lowest elevation: 160 m (520 ft)
- Population (2023): 476
  - Density: 30.9/km^{2} (80.0/sq mi)
- Time zone: UTC+01:00 (CET)
  - Summer (DST): UTC+02:00 (CEST)
- INSEE/Postal code: 07020 /07400
- ^{1} French Land Register data, which excludes lakes, ponds, glaciers > 1 km^{2} (0.386 sq mi or 247 acres) and river estuaries.

Aubignas (French pronunciation: [obiɲas]) is a commune in the Ardèche department in the Auvergne-Rhône-Alpes region of southern France.

== Geography ==
Aubignas is located some 10 km west by north-west of Montelimar, 6 km north-west of Le Teil and 16 km south of Privas. Access to the commune is by Route nationale N102 from Le Teil in the south-east which passes through the south of the commune forming part of the southern border and continues west to Saint-Jean-le-Centenier. Access to the village in the centre of the commune is by the Champagnet road which goes north from the N102. Apart from the village there is the hamlet of Pignatelle in the south The commune is forested in the north with farmland in the south.

The Frayol rises in the north of the commune and flows south-east gathering many tributaries and continuing to join the Rhone at Le Teil. The Ruisseau des Avents forms the eastern border of the commune as it flows south to join the Frayol as it leaves the commune. The Ruisseau de l'Eguille rises in the north-west of the commune and flows south to join the Escoutay at Alba-la-Romaine.

=== Heraldry ===
Arms of Aubignas	Blazon: Party per pale, at 1 Azure, a bend of Or enhanced to sinister filled in with 3 ordinaries of Gules in pale; at 2 Argent, a standard wavy of Azure on a pole of Sable surmounting 5 ermine spots of Sable set 3 and 2.

== Administration ==
List of Successive Mayors

From	To	Name	Party
2001	2008	Alain Floribert	PCF
2008	2020	Christian Bosquet	
2020	current	Serge Villard	

== Demography ==
The inhabitants of the commune are known as Aubignassiens or Aubignassiennes in French.

Historical population

Year	Pop.	±% p.a.
1793	312	—
1800	203	−5.96%
1806	379	+10.97%
1821	309	−1.35%
1831	488	+4.68%
1836	497	+0.37%
1841	524	+1.06%
1846	510	−0.54%
1851	548	+1.45%
1856	544	−0.15%
1861	539	−0.18%
1866	523	−0.60%
1872	528	+0.16%
1876	531	+0.14%
1881	559	+1.03%
1886	542	−0.62%
1891	481	−2.36%
1896	423	−2.54%
1901	417	−0.29%

Year	Pop.	±% p.a.
1906	440	+1.08%
1911	382	−2.79%
1921	300	−2.39%
1926	271	−2.01%
1931	367	+6.25%
1936	385	+0.96%
1946	204	−6.15%
1954	210	+0.36%
1962	258	+2.61%
1968	208	−3.53%
1975	230	+1.45%
1982	246	+0.97%
1990	308	+2.85%
1999	337	+1.00%
2007	385	+1.68%
2012	457	+3.49%
2017	469	+0.52%
2023	476	+0.25%

Source: EHESS and INSEE

== Culture and heritage ==
=== Civil heritage ===
The commune has many houses and farmhouses that are registered as historical monuments:

- The 10th House (19th century)
- The 11th House (15th century)
- The 12th House (19th century)
- The 13th House (19th century)
- The Mas du Bouchet Farmhouse at le Bouchet (13th century)
- The 1st Farmhouse (1841)
- The Domain of Colombier Farmhouse (15th century)
- The 1st House (17th century)
- The 2nd Farmhouse at le Bouchet (16th century)
- The 2nd Farmhouse at Aunas (1844)
- The 2nd Farmhouse at le Colombier (16th century)
- The 2nd House (1711)
- The 3rd House (17th century)
- The 4th House (18th century)
- The 5th House (1802)
- The 6th House (17th century)
- The 7th House (17th century)
- The 8th House (1796)
- The 9th House (1843)
- Largelas Bridge (19th century)
- A Fortified Chateau (12th century)
- Houses (16th-19th centuries)
- A Farmhouse at les Combes (1825)
- A Farmhouse (1847)
- A House called a Chateau (16th century)
- A Farmhouse at la Mure (1648)
- A Farmhouse at Liotard (16th century)
- Farmhouses (13th-20th centuries)
- A Farmhouse at Rabayas (16th century)
- A Farmhouse at Fongiraud (18th century)
- A Farmhouse at Pignatelle (1840)
- TheMas de Cantonne Farmhouse (18th century)
- TheMas de l'Aiguille Farmhouse (16th century)
- A Farmhouse at le Clos (1857)
- A Farmhouse at la Grangette (16th century)
- A Farmhouse at Chazelles (1834)
- A Farmhouse at Peyrolle (15th century)
- A Farmhouse at la Fare (1840)
- A Farmhouse at Chante duc (16th century)
- A Flour Mill at la Mure (15th century)
- A Fountain (18th century)
- The Town Fortification (11th century)
- The Village (11th century)
- The Town Hall and School (1888). The town hall contains an item that is registered as a historical object:
  - A Relief: Christ on the Cross (15th century)

=== Religious heritage ===
The commune has a church and some structures that are registered as historical monuments:

- A Wayside Cross at Liotard (19th century)
- An Oratory Chapelette
- The Church of the Assumption(11th century)
- A 'Cemetery Cross (19th century)
- A 'Monumental Cross (19th century)

The Church contains many items that are registered as historical objects:

- A Statue: Saint Regis (19th century)
- A Statue: Saint Diacre (19th century)
- A Statue: Saint Joseph (19th century)
- A Statue: Virgin and Child (19th century)
- The Marie Françoise Léon Bell (1946)
- A Statue: Saint Joseph (18th century)
- A Statue: Saint François Régis (18th century)
- A Statue: Saint Vincent (18th century)
- A Statue: Virgin and Child (18th century)
- A Monumental Cross: Christ on the Cross (19th century)

== Notable people linked to the commune ==
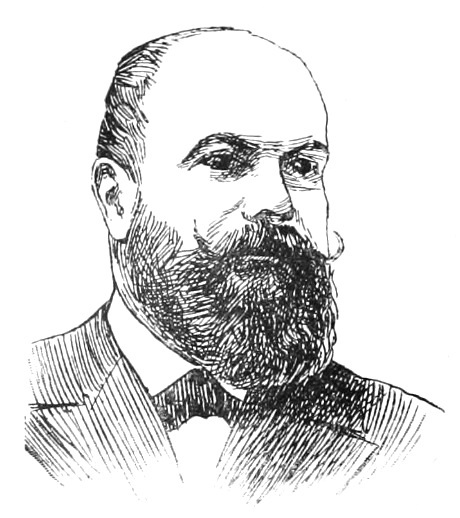
Placide Astier

- Placide Astier was born in the commune on 23 February 1856 and died in Paris on 6 March |1918. He was a scientist and French politician.

== See also ==
- Communes of the Ardèche department
