= Sanquette =

Occitan blood dish

- Alternative names: Occitan: sanqueta; Aranese Occitan: sanganhèta; Catalan: sangada
- Type: Blood dish; Pancake/Crêpe
- Region or state: Occitania
- Associated cuisine: Occitan cuisine
- Main ingredients: Fresh blood
- Ingredients generally used: Bacon; Persillade; Vinegar
- Similar dishes: Filloas de sangre

Sanquette (Note: also sanguette, sanguet, sanquet) (French; Occitan: sanqueta; Aranese Occitan: sanganhèta; Catalan: sangada) is a blood dish from rural Occitania. The dish is made immediately upon exsanguination of livestock: the fresh blood is immediately collected, prepared and cooked. Typically a crêpe or pancake, sanquette varies by town across Occitania, including Spanish Occitania.

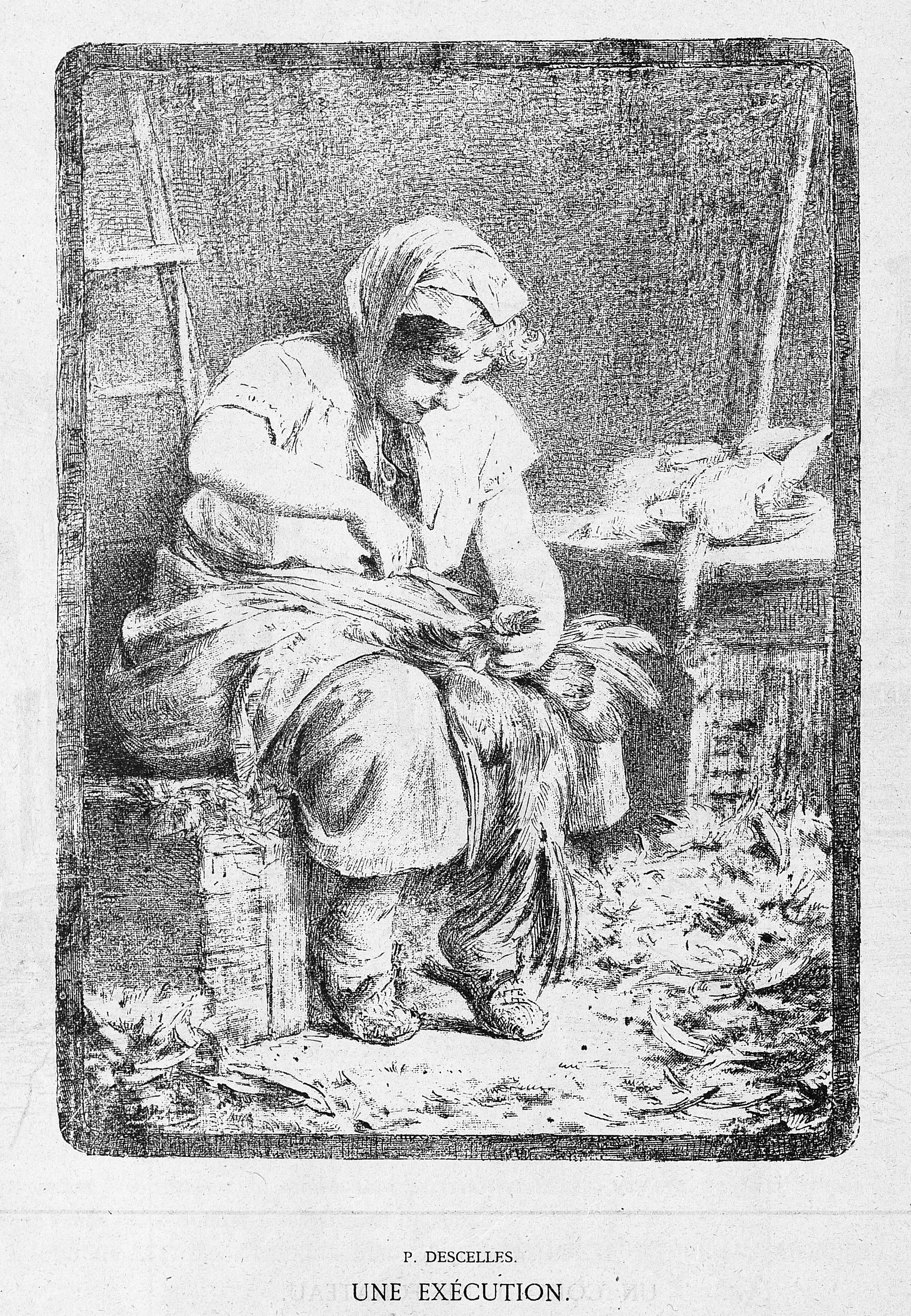
Illustration of a French farmer slaughtering a chicken, 1886

== Preparation ==
Sanquette may be made with the blood of various Western European farm animals, including chicken, duck, cow, goat and rabbit. Sanquette was traditionally made during the annual pig slaughter (tue-cochon), to use every part of the pig. Sanquette is also made during the slaughter of geese, a traditionally female activity in Occitania.

The blood of the freshly exsanguinated animal is collected and mixed with bacon (the inclusion of which may be called sanguette vive) and a persillade of parsley and garlic, along with vinegar to prolong coagulation, and flour or bread crumbs to bind. The mixture—depending on preparation, of a consistency between a blood curd and pancake batter—is then fried in lard and served.

=== Variations ===
Variations in Ardèche include sanguette pochée, an omelette; sanquet de la faraça des Vans, with spinach and offal; sanquet au vin blanc or sanquet de Vinezac, with collard greens, offal and white wine; and sanquette de Saint-Pons, with giblets and sorrel. In Béarn, sanquette is a stew made with the blood, cheeks, tripe and spleen of a calf, finished with cornichons and capers. In Val d'Aran, the dish is known in the Aranese dialect as sanganhèta; the dish is largely similar to other parts of Occitania.

== History ==
The dish was first attested to in French language text in 1796, in the Montpellier region, as "sanquet", from the Occitan language sanké ("wild"). The formation "sanquette" was attested to by 1900. By the late 1970s, sanquette was still a traditional food made during slaughter in Gers and Tarn, but had diminished in Landes, where blood was increasingly seen as worthless byproduct.

== Usage of the term outside of food ==
Sanquette (also sanquetto) as jargon is a catachresis used in rugby football to describe a dynamic player. It features in the rally song of CA Castelsarrasin in Castelsarrasin.
