= Olivier de Serres =

French author

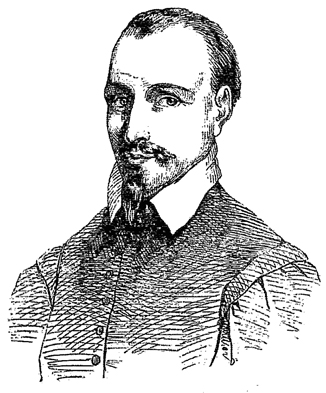
- Born: 1539; Villeneuve-de-Berg, Ardèche
- Died: 1619 (aged 79–80)
- Occupations: author, soil scientist
- Known for: accepted textbook of French agriculture in the 17th century
- Notable work: Théâtre d'Agriculture (book)
- Relatives: Jean de Serres (brother)

Olivier de Serres (French pronunciation: [ɔlivje də sɛʁ]; 1539–1619) was a French author and soil scientist whose Théâtre d'Agriculture (1600) became the standard reference on French agriculture in the 17th century.

== Biography ==
Serres was born in 1539 at Villeneuve-de-Berg, Ardèche. His brother, Jean de Serres, was a well-known French humanist and translated the complete works of Plato.

His book was notable for recommending winegrowers to plant 5 to 6 varieties in their vineyards to balance the risk of a crop failing, an example of crop diversity.

It also recommended métayage (sharecropping) so that cash tenants would take all the risks and thus demand lower rent, as hired labour is expensive to manage. Sharecroppers administer themselves and risks are divided with the landlord. According to him, only large landowners should take the risk of hiring labourers and running the estate themselves.

== Domaine Olivier de Serres ==
The Domaine Olivier de Serres is Olivier de Serres' former estate, located in Ardèche. It hosts facilities for visitors and agricultural research and teaching facilities, including some operated by Grenoble Alpes University.

== See also ==
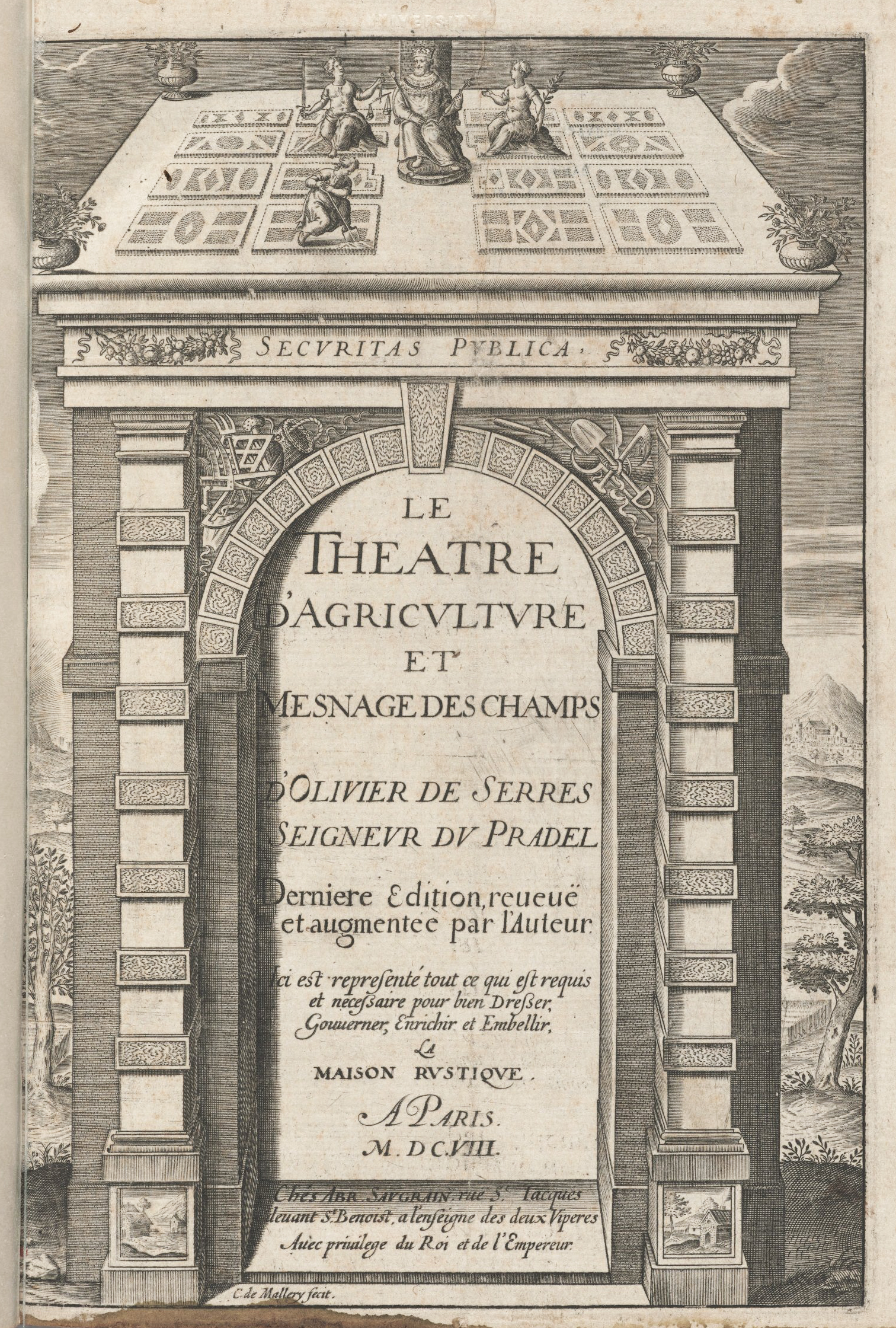
Le theatre d'agriculture, 1608

- Sugar beet
- Sarasson
