= Jean de Serres =

French theologian and historian (1540–1598)

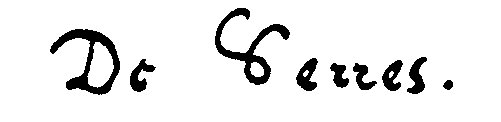
- Signature of Jean de Serres
- Born: 1540; Villeneuve-de-Berg, France
- Died: 1598 (aged 57–58)
- Other names: Joannes Serranus
- Occupation(s): Historian, classicist, Plato scholar
- Known for: 1578 translation of Plato in edition of Stephanus
- Relatives: Olivier de Serres (brother)

Jean de Serres (French: [sɛʁ]; Latin: Joannes Serranus; 1540–1598) was a major French historian and an advisor to King Henry IV during the Wars of Religion that marred the French Reformation in the second half of the Sixteenth Century. As a refugee from religious persecution, he was educated in Switzerland and became a Calvinist pastor, humanist, poet, polemicist, and diplomat. His complete translation of Plato appeared in the famous 1578 edition published by Henri Estienne, which is the source of the standard 'Stephanus numbers' still used by scholars to refer to Plato's works. In 1596, de Serres was appointed 'Historian of France' by King Henry IV. His posthumously published History of France was an 'immense success' and was not superseded for almost a century.

== Early life ==
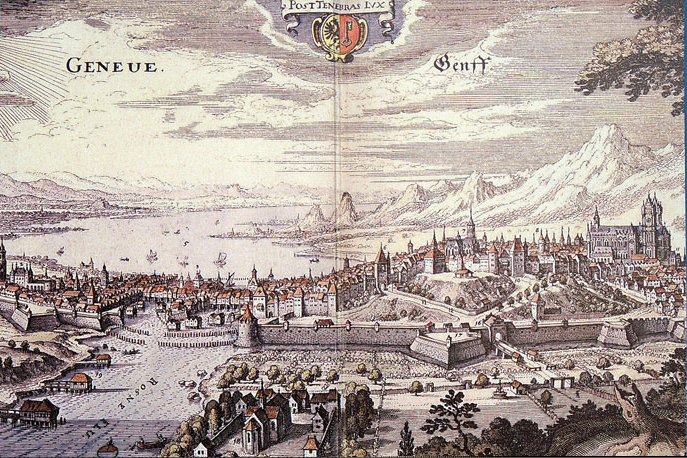
Geneva (about 1600) was a refuge for Protestants fleeing the religious wars in France, including Jean de Serres and his family. The words at top read 'After darkness, light.'

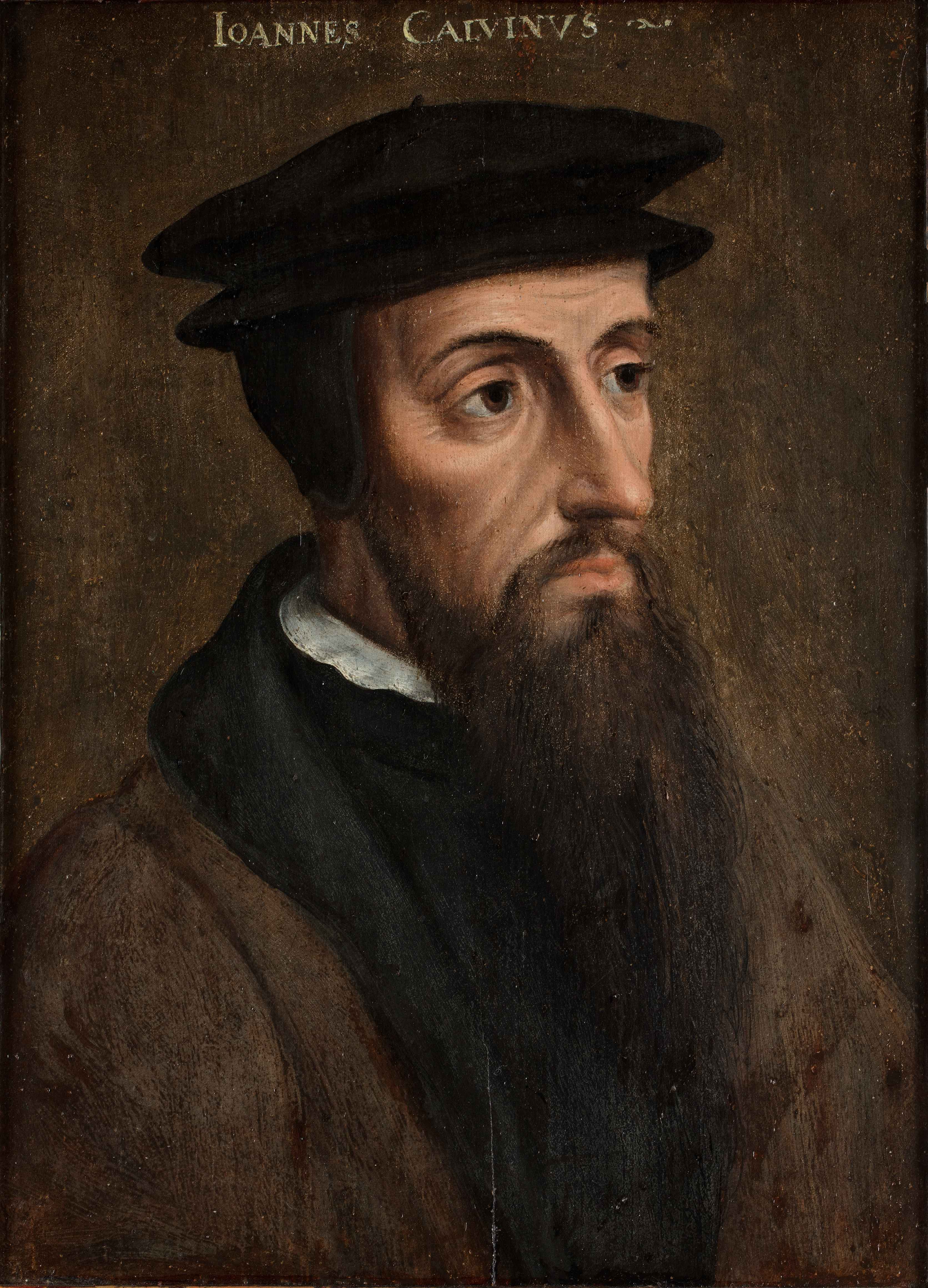
Portrait of John Calvin, Protestant theologian.

Jean de Serres was born in 1540 at Villeneuve-de-Berg, France, in a Calvinist family. His mother was Louise de Léris (or Lheris). He was the brother of the celebrated agriculturalist Olivier de Serres and of another brother Raymond. Jean de Serres married a daughter of Pierre Godary and Bernardine Richier named Marguerite on April 25, 1569. The bride's family were French Protestent refugees from Lorraine living, like de Serres, in Switzerland. The marriage produced nine children.

At about the age of 13, de Serres escaped from France into Switzerland to avoid the persecutions and massacres of Protestants that preceded the French Wars of Religion (1562–98). He studied classical literature at the Académie de Lausanne (now the University of Lausanne) in Switzerland from 1557 to 1559, and then theology at the Académie de Genève (now the University of Geneva) until 1566. He was a member of the first class to attend this school, which was founded by Calvin himself. He was next a pastor at the Reformed Church of Jussy.

In 1569–71, de Serres began publishing his Commentaries on the State of Religion and the Republic in the Kingdom of France, which described the recent massacres and civil war in France. It was written in Latin to appeal to a European-wide audience and was extended and reprinted many times. According to de Serres, the Queen, Catherine de' Medici, had long plotted the destruction of Protestantism, and the St. Bartholomew's Day massacre of 1572 was only the culmination of her plans.

== Translation of Plato ==
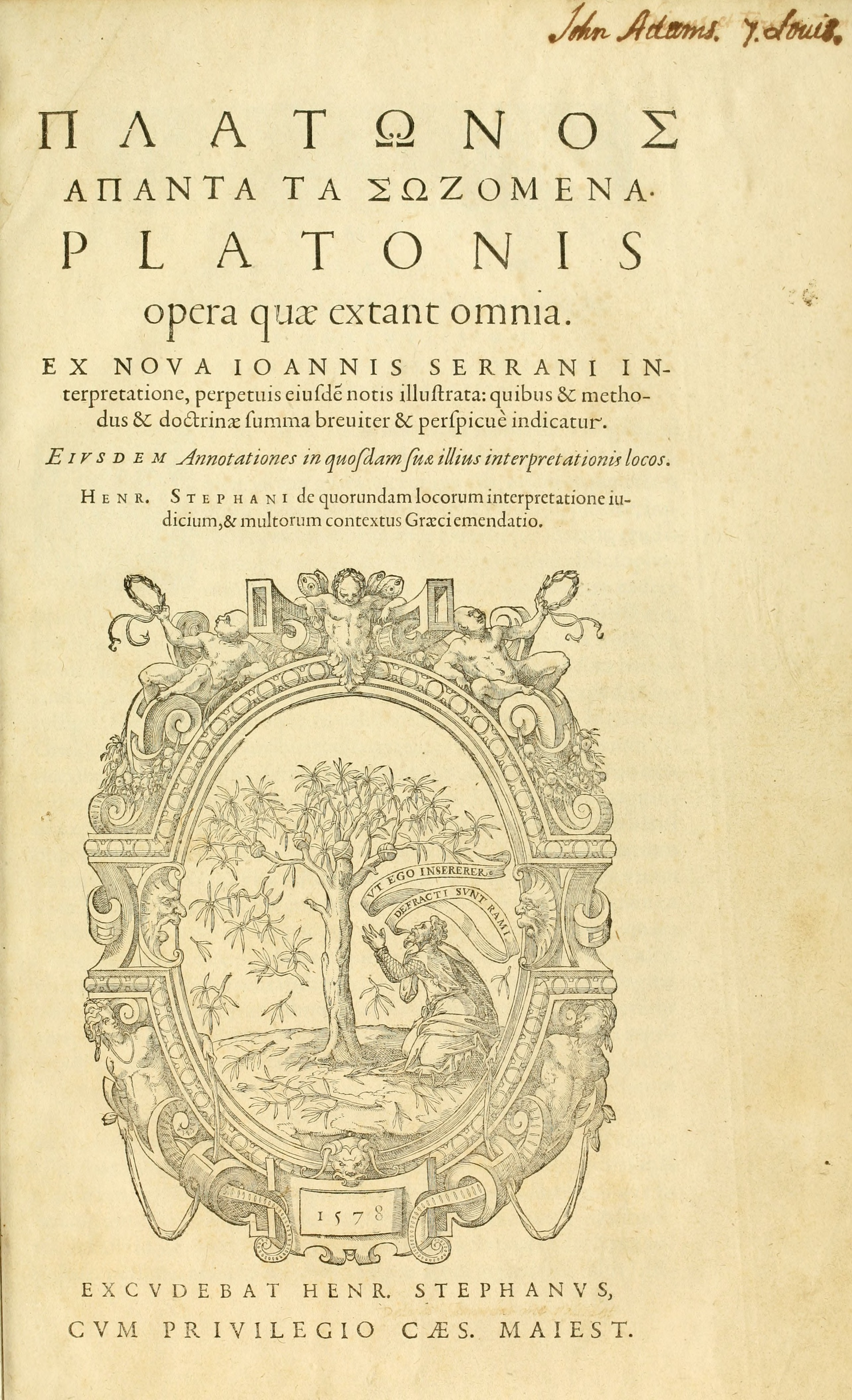
Plato's Dialogues were translated in 1578 by Jean de Serres and edited by Henri Estienne, image of copy owned by John Adams (1735 – 1826), second President of the United States

After falling out with the consistory of Geneva, he returned to Lausanne, Switzerland, where he became the principal of the college. He arrived in 1572 at the same time as many refugees escaping the St. Bartholomew's Day massacre. There, he turned from religious controversies and devoted some two years to translating Plato:

As after a grave illness, my bodily forces were exhausted. There was no kind of study that might assure me of some repose, and I searched anxiously on all sides for a way to employ my leisure, not knowing on what to settle. God then furnished me an opportunity which kept me occupied for two years with the study of the philosophy of Plato. This was for me a grand pleasure and a release from occupations of various kinds that had assailed me.

After many delays, this work 'which the world of learning throughout Europe awaited with impatience' finally appeared in the Spring of 1578. The three-volume, bilingual edition (Greek and Latin) was some 2,000 pages long. De Serres contributed the abundant notes that accompany his translations, the prefaces, and the analyses of each dialogue. It was 'for two centuries the indispensable instrument of Plato studies.'

== Later controversies ==
De Serres' translation of Plato further burnished his reputation, and he was called to Nîmes in 1579 to reform the city's college. While in Nîmes, he published a commentary on the book of Ecclesiastes that asserted the book had an underlying, philosophical unity.

From about 1579, de Serres became an associate of Henry of Navarre, later King Henri IV.

In 1582–1586, he published Four Anti-Jesuit Tracts that aimed to demonstrate the 'errors, abuse, and superstitions of Catholicism' and defend Calvinist doctrine. In 1589, he became the pastor at the city of Orange.

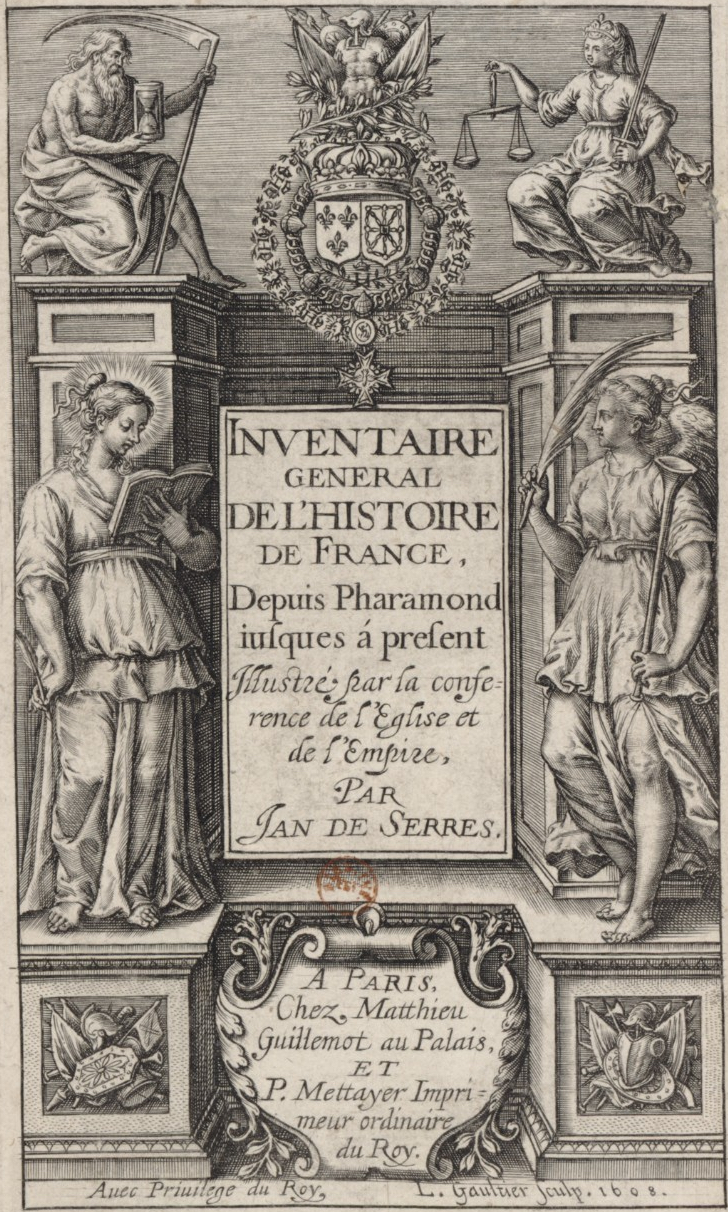
A General History of France, by Jean de Serres

In 1596, King Henri IV named de Serres the 'Historian of France.' He was employed by the king, both in France and abroad, to attempt to bring about a rapprochement between the warring religious sects in France. This led to a national controversy that caused the great majority of both Calvinists and Catholics to distrust de Serres. He died in 1598 after a short illness, which his contemporaries believed was the result of poisoning.

His short history of France, Inventaire de l'Histoire de France, was published shortly after his death. According to Dardier, 'The success of the Inventaire was immense, and it was deserved... For the first time, the facts were presented in chronological order, clearly and methodically. This work was not superseded until 1683 ...'

He was not so much a 'defender of religious tolerance' (a concept that became common only in the Eighteenth Century) as much as an advocate of the union of the two main sects, the Calvinists and Catholics. This earned him the opprobrium of his coreligionists and the reputation of a renegade, a legend that was spread by certain contemporary writers.

== Poems ==
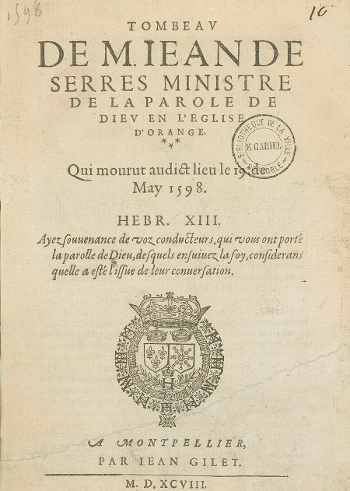
The title reads Funeral Monument of Monsieur Jean de Serres, Minister of the Word of God in the Church at Orange.

A book of poems by de Serres, entitled Tombeau ('Funeral Monument'), was published soon after his death. A single copy was discovered in 2013 in the library at Grenoble. According to Vidal, de Serres' poems 'attest to his fidelity to the reformed religion and contradict the slanders made about his faith.'

== Works ==
- Mémoires de la III guerre civile et des derniers troubles de France, 1570
- Commentariorum de statu religionis et Reipublicae in Regno Galliae, 1571. This work, printed by Jean Crespin, covered the wars of religion from 1557 to 1570, and was the first history of these wars based on the testimonies of French refugees who had reached Switzerland. In 1575, he added a fourth part that extended the work to 1574.
- Gasparis Colinii, Castellonii, magni quondam Franciae amiralii, vita, 1575
- Platonis Opera, Genève, 1578. This edition, the result of a collaboration with Henri Estienne, is considered a standard work and is the source of the 'Stephanus numbers' mentioned above.
- De l'Immortalité de l'âme, 1596
- Inventaire de l'Histoire de France, 1597. This work, written while he was working as historian to the king, was frequently reprinted with additions. Translated into English with later additions as John De Serres, A Generall Historie of France (London, Eld and Flecher, 1624).
- Histoire des choses mémorables avenues en France, depuis l'an 1547 jusques au commencement de l'an 1597, sous le règne de Henri II, François II, Charles IX, Henri III et Henri IV, 1599
