= Canton of Berg-Helvie =

Canton of France

Coordinates: 44.55°N 4.68°E

- Canton
- Situation of the canton of Berg-Helvie in the department of Ardèche
- Country: France
- Region: Auvergne-Rhône-Alpes
- Department: Ardèche
- No. of communes: {{{nbcomm}}}
- Population (2023): 21,915
- INSEE code: 0712

The canton of Berg-Helvie is an administrative division of the Ardèche department, southern France. It was created at the French canton reorganisation which came into effect in March 2015. Its seat is in Le Teil.

It consists of the following communes:

1. Alba-la-Romaine
2. Aubignas
3. Berzème
4. Darbres
5. Lavilledieu
6. Lussas
7. Mirabel
8. Saint-Andéol-de-Berg
9. Saint-Germain
10. Saint-Gineys-en-Coiron
11. Saint-Jean-le-Centenier
12. Saint-Laurent-sous-Coiron
13. Saint-Maurice-d'Ibie
14. Saint-Pons
15. Saint-Thomé
16. Sceautres
17. Le Teil
18. Valvignères
19. Villeneuve-de-Berg
