= Saint-Maurice-d'Ibie =

- Commune
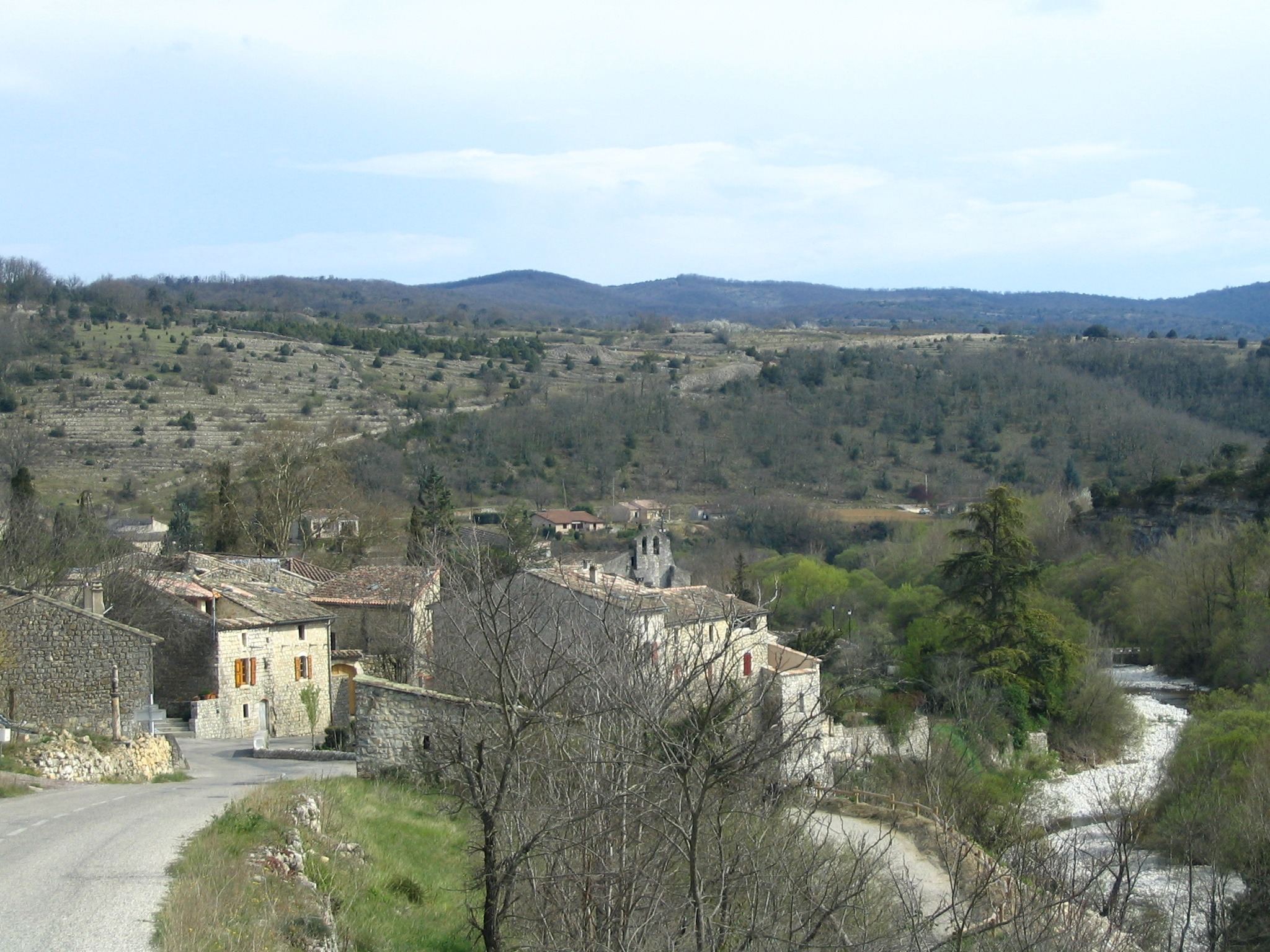
- Saint-Maurice-d'Ibie, with the Ibie on the right
- Location of Saint-Maurice-d'Ibie
- Location within France Location within Auvergne-Rhône-Alpes
- Coordinates: 44°30′04″N 4°29′00″E
- Country: France
- Region: Auvergne-Rhône-Alpes
- Department: Ardèche
- Arrondissement: Largentière
- Canton: Berg-Helvie
- Intercommunality: Berg et Coiron

Government
  - Mayor (2020–2026): Pierre-Henri Chanal
- Area^{1}: 23.3 km^{2} (9.0 sq mi)
- Elevation: 212 m (696 ft)
- Highest elevation: 490 m (1,610 ft)
- Lowest elevation: 174 m (571 ft)
- Population (2023): 212
  - Density: 9.10/km^{2} (23.6/sq mi)
- Time zone: UTC+01:00 (CET)
  - Summer (DST): UTC+02:00 (CEST)
- INSEE/Postal code: 07273 /07170
- ^{1} French Land Register data, which excludes lakes, ponds, glaciers > 1 km^{2} (0.386 sq mi or 247 acres) and river estuaries.

Saint-Maurice-d'Ibie (French pronunciation: [sɛ̃ mɔʁis dibi]; Occitan: Sant Maurici d'Ibia) is a commune in the Ardèche department in southern France.

== Geography ==
The village lies in the north-western part of the commune, on the left bank of the river Ibie.

== Population ==
Historical population
Year	Pop.	±% p.a.
1968	150	—
1975	159	+0.84%
1982	183	+2.03%
1990	163	−1.44%
1999	160	−0.21%
2007	193	+2.37%
2012	233	+3.84%
2017	221	−1.05%
2023	212	−0.69%
Source: INSEE

== See also ==
- Communes of the Ardèche department
