= Sarasson =

French cheese made from buttermilk

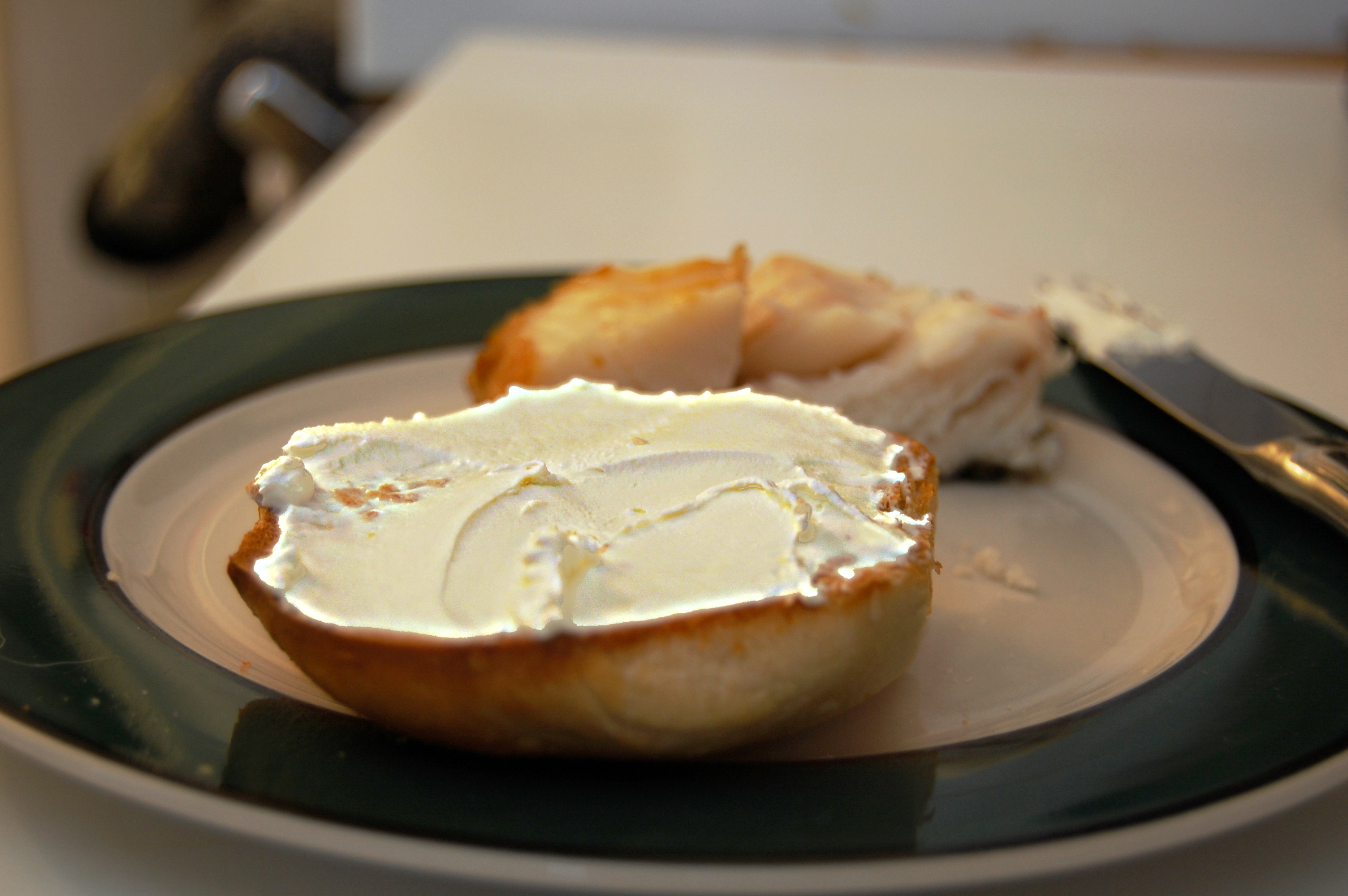
- Country of origin: France
- Region: Forez, Vivarais, south parts of Livradois, north parts of Vel
- Source of milk: Domestic cow, Goat
- Pasteurized: No
- Texture: Cream cheese

Sarasson (French pronunciation: [sa.ʁa.sɔ̃]) is a French dairy product resembling fromage blanc made from buttermilk. It is traditionally produced in the French departments of Loire, Ardèche, Haute-Loire and Puy-de-Dôme. In the 1600 textbook of agriculture Théâtre d’agriculture et mesnage des champs, Olivier de Serres mentions the product.

== See also ==
- List of dairy products
