= Valvignères =

- Commune
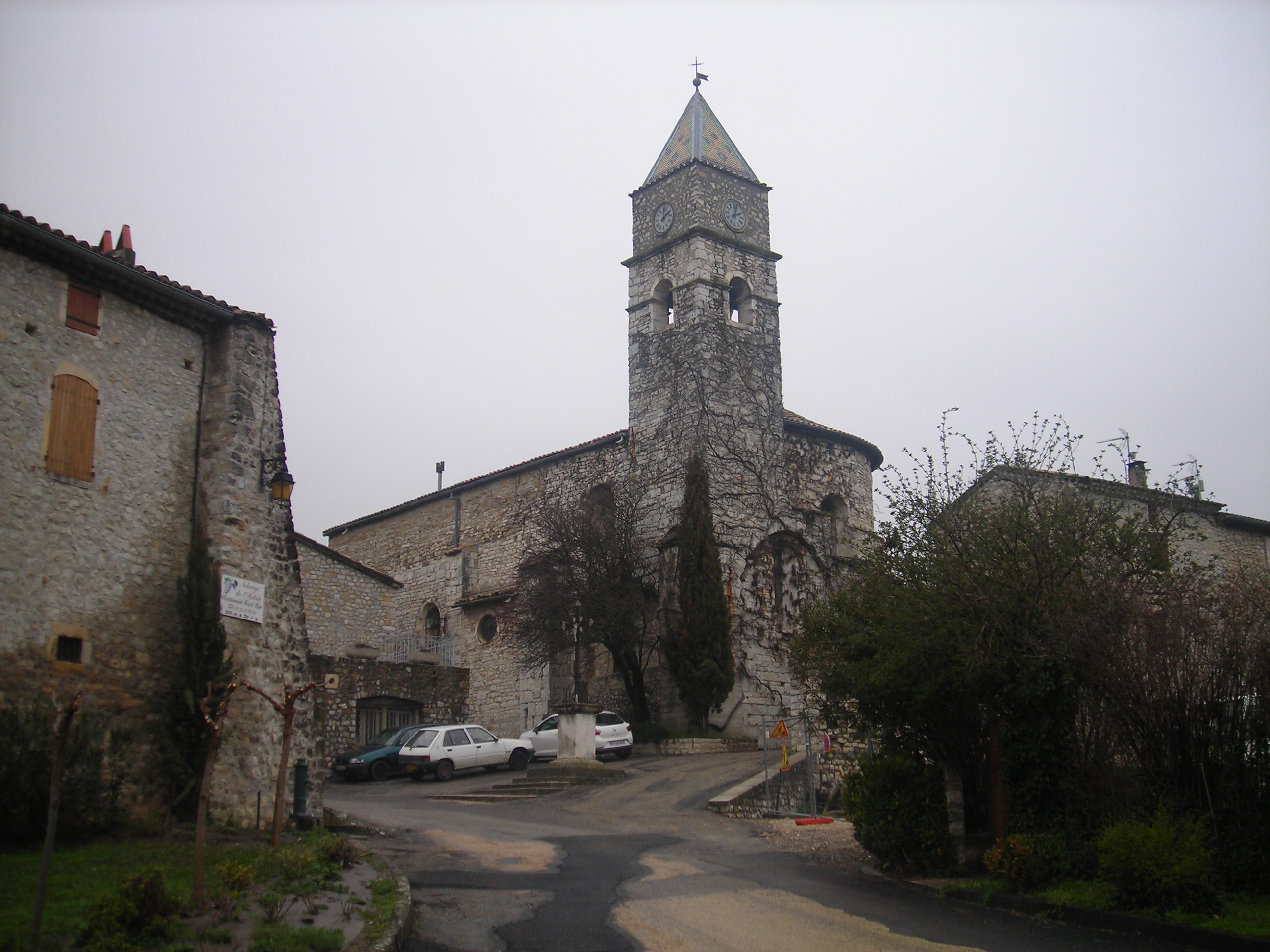
- The church in Valvignères
- Location of Valvignères
- Location within France Location within Auvergne-Rhône-Alpes
- Coordinates: 44°30′05″N 4°34′30″E
- Country: France
- Region: Auvergne-Rhône-Alpes
- Department: Ardèche
- Arrondissement: Privas
- Canton: Berg-Helvie

Government
  - Mayor (2020–2026): Jean-Luc Flaugere
- Area^{1}: 29.78 km^{2} (11.50 sq mi)
- Elevation: 196 m (643 ft)
- Highest elevation: 521 m (1,709 ft)
- Lowest elevation: 136 m (446 ft)
- Population (2023): 440
  - Density: 15/km^{2} (38/sq mi)
- Time zone: UTC+01:00 (CET)
  - Summer (DST): UTC+02:00 (CEST)
- INSEE/Postal code: 07332 /07400
- ^{1} French Land Register data, which excludes lakes, ponds, glaciers > 1 km^{2} (0.386 sq mi or 247 acres) and river estuaries.

Valvignères (French pronunciation: [valviɲɛʁ]; Occitan: Vauvinhièra) is a commune in the Ardèche department in southern France.

== Population ==
Historical population
Year	Pop.	±% p.a.
1968	341	—
1975	311	−1.31%
1982	318	+0.32%
1990	336	+0.69%
1999	377	+1.29%
2007	416	+1.24%
2012	477	+2.77%
2017	466	−0.47%
2023	440	−0.95%
Source: INSEE

== See also ==
- Communes of the Ardèche department
