= Sceautres =

- Commune
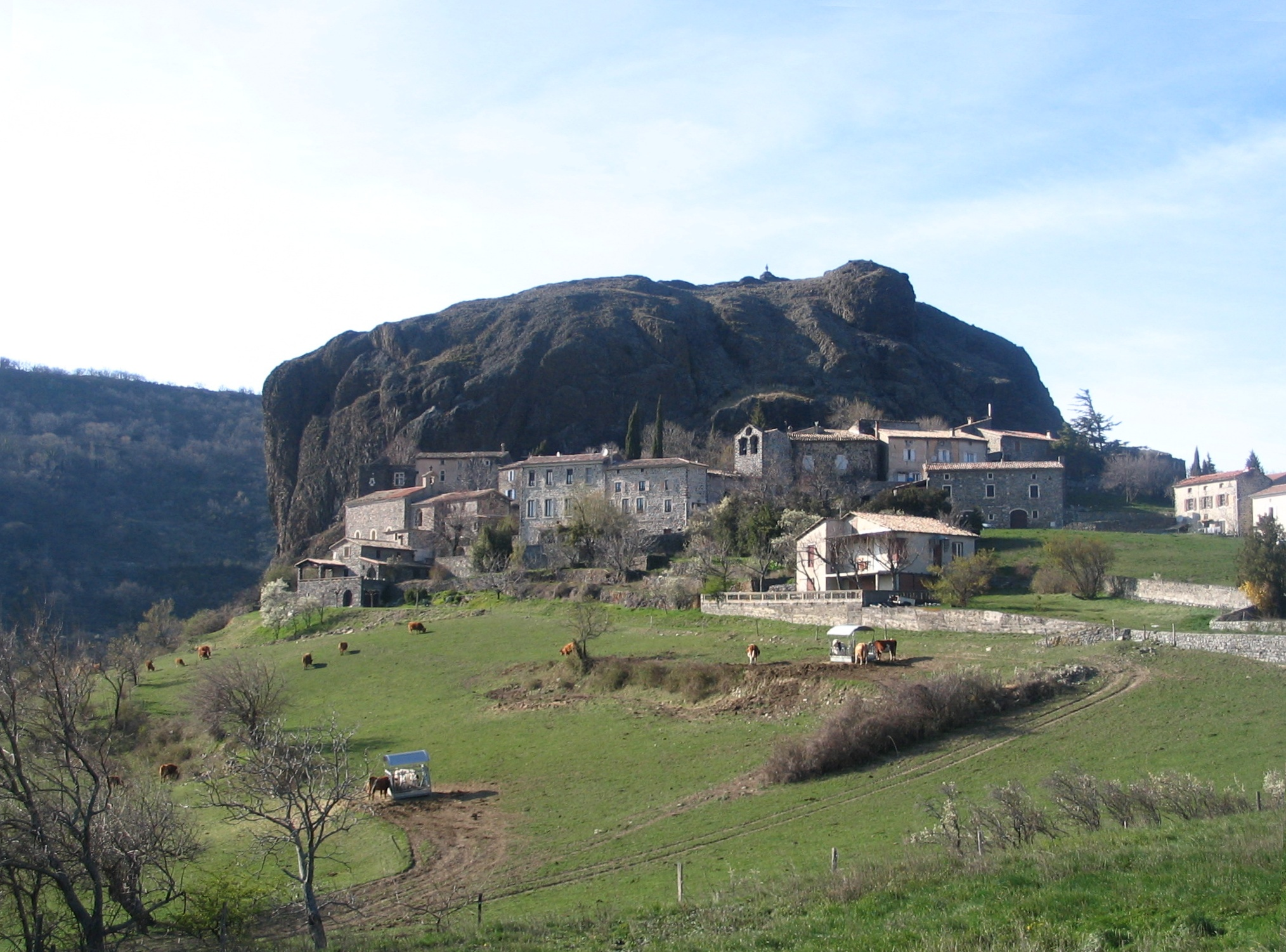
- A general view of Sceautres
- Location of Sceautres
- Location within France Location within Auvergne-Rhône-Alpes
- Coordinates: 44°37′01″N 4°36′33″E
- Country: France
- Region: Auvergne-Rhône-Alpes
- Department: Ardèche
- Arrondissement: Largentière
- Canton: Berg-Helvie
- Intercommunality: Berg et Coiron

Government
  - Mayor (2020–2026): Joël Cros
- Area^{1}: 14.64 km^{2} (5.65 sq mi)
- Elevation: 430 m (1,410 ft)
- Highest elevation: 703 m (2,306 ft)
- Lowest elevation: 292 m (958 ft)
- Population (2023): 143
  - Density: 9.77/km^{2} (25.3/sq mi)
- Time zone: UTC+01:00 (CET)
  - Summer (DST): UTC+02:00 (CEST)
- INSEE/Postal code: 07311 /07400
- ^{1} French Land Register data, which excludes lakes, ponds, glaciers > 1 km^{2} (0.386 sq mi or 247 acres) and river estuaries.

Sceautres (French pronunciation: [sotʁ]; Occitan: Çautre) is a commune in the Ardèche department in southern France.

== Population ==
Historical population
Year	Pop.	±% p.a.
1968	125	—
1975	110	−1.81%
1982	96	−1.93%
1990	96	+0.00%
1999	104	+0.89%
2007	137	+3.50%
2012	145	+1.14%
2017	144	−0.14%
2023	143	−0.12%
Source: INSEE

== See also ==
- Communes of the Ardèche department
