= Henri Estienne =

French printer and classical scholar (1528/1531–1598)

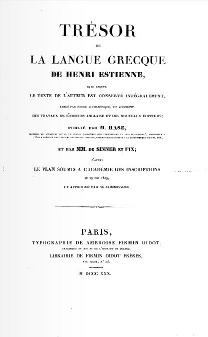
Trésor de la langue grecque (a French edition of 1830)

Henri Estienne (/eɪˈtjɛn/ ay-TYEN, French: [ɑ̃ʁi etjɛn]; 1528 or 1531 – 1598), also known as Henricus Stephanus (/ˈstɛfənəs/ STEF-ən-əs), was a French printer and classical scholar. He was the eldest son of Robert Estienne. He was instructed in Latin, Greek, and Hebrew by his father and would eventually take over the Estienne printing firm which his father owned in 1559 when his father died. His best-known work was the Thesaurus graecae linguae, which was printed in five volumes. It became the basis of Greek lexicology; no dictionary would rival that of Estienne's for three hundred years.

Among his many publications of Greek authors, his publications of Plato are the source of Stephanus pagination, which is still used to refer to Plato's works. Estienne was also responsible for the first printed Latin translation of the works of Sextus Empiricus in 1562, which scholars credit for the diffusion of Pyrrhonian skepticism in early modern Europe, and its adoption by highly influential skeptical philosophers such as Michel de Montaigne. Estienne died in Lyon in 1598.

== Life ==
Henri Estienne was born in Paris in 1528 or 1531. (Note: Sources have conflicting information about whether he was born in 1528 or 1531.) His father instructed him in Latin, Greek, Hebrew, and typography, and according to a note in his edition of Aulus Gellius (1585), he picked up some Latin as a child, as that language was used as a lingua franca in the multi-national household. However, he was primarily instructed in Greek by Pierre Danès. He was also educated by other French scholars such as Adrianus Turnebus. He began working for his father's business at age eighteen and was employed by his father to collate a manuscript of Dionysius of Halicarnassus. In 1547, as part of his training, he traveled to Italy, England, and Flanders, where he learned Spanish and busied himself in collecting and collating manuscripts for his father's press. Around 1551, Robert Estienne fled to Geneva with his family, including Henri Estienne, to escape religious persecution in Paris. The same year, he translated Calvin's catechism into Greek, which was printed in 1554 in his father's printing room.

Estienne published the Anacreon in 1554, which was his first independent work. Afterwards, he returned to Italy to assist the Aldine Press in Venice. In Italy, he discovered a copy of Diodorus Siculus in Rome, and returned to Geneva in 1555. In 1557 he likely had a printing establishment of his own, advertising himself as the "Parisian printer" (typographus parisiensis). The following year he assumed the title illustris viri Huldrici Fuggeri typographus from his patron, Ulrich Fugger who saved him from financial despair after the death of his father. Estienne published the first anthology that included sections from Parmenides, Empedocles, and other Pre-Socratic philosophers.

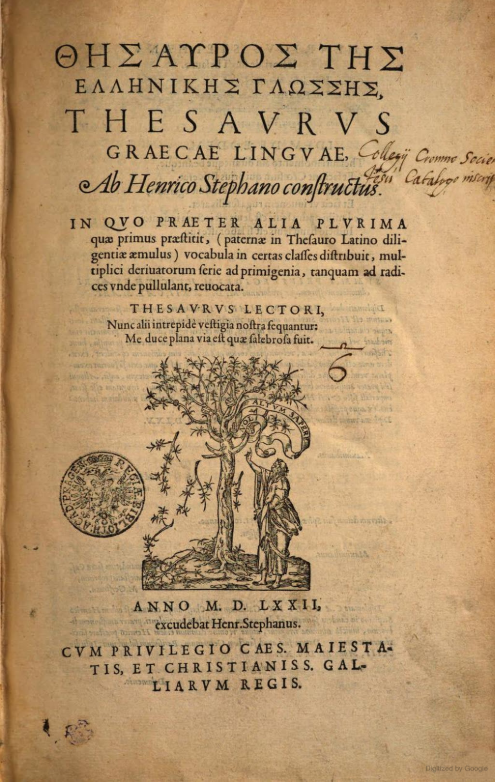
Title page of Henri Estienne's 1572 Thesaurus Graecae Linguae

In 1559, on his father's death, Estienne assumed charge of his presses and became Printer of the Republic of Geneva. In the same year he produced his own Latin translation of the works of Sextus Empiricus, and an edition of Diodorus Siculus based on his earlier discoveries. In 1565, he printed a large French Bible. The following year he published his best-known French work, the Apologie pour Hérodote. Some passages being considered objectionable by the Genevan Consistory, he was compelled to cancel the pages containing them. The book became highly popular, and within sixteen years twelve editions were printed. Estienne used the type he inherited and did not invent any new types.

His most celebrated work, the Thesaurus graecae linguae ("Treasure of the Greek language"), appeared in five volumes in 1572. This dictionary was a sequel to Robert Estienne's Latin dictionary. The basis of Greek lexicography, a Greek dictionary to rival that of Estiennes was not printed for over 300 years. This work was begun by his father and served up to the nineteenth century as the basis of Greek lexicography. However, the sale of this dictionary was impeded due to its high price and the printing of an abridged copy later. In 1576 and 1587, Estienne published two Greek versions of the New Testament. The 1576 version contained the first scientific treatise on the language of the apostolic writers. The 1587 version contained a discussion on the ancient divisions of the text. Estienne's other publications included those of Herodotus, Plato, Horace, Virgil, Plutarch, and Pliny the Elder. He also published an edition of Aeschylus, in which Agamemnon was printed in its entirety and as a separate play for the first time.

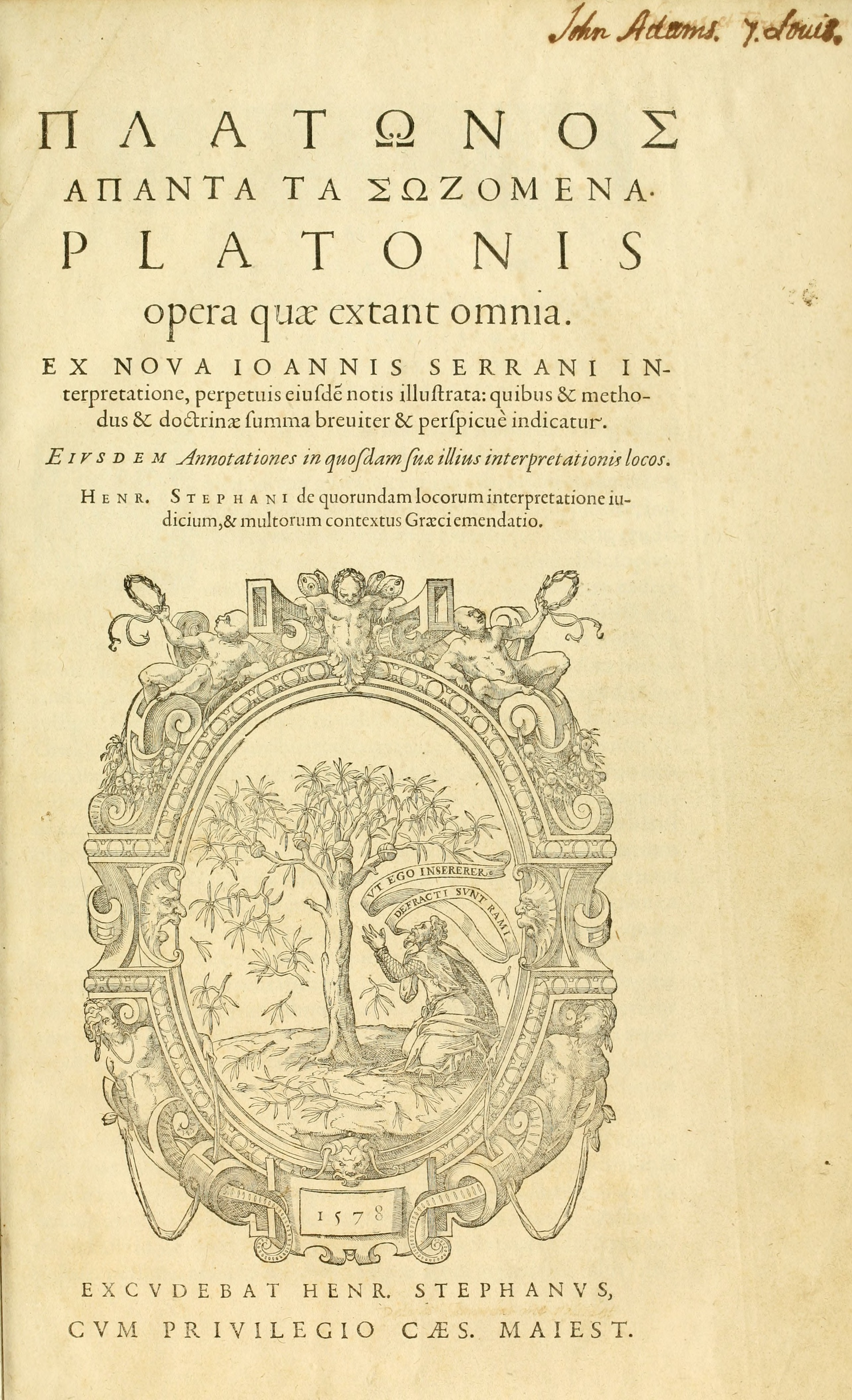
Plato's Dialogues were translated in 1578 by Jean de Serres and edited by Henri Estienne, image of copy owned by John Adams (1735–1826), second President of the United States

In 1578 he published the first and one of the most important editions of the complete works of Plato, translated by Jean de Serres, with commentary. This work is the source of the standard "Stephanus numbers" used by scholars today to refer to the works of Plato.

The publication in 1578 of his Deux Dialogues du nouveau françois italianizé brought him into a fresh dispute with the consistory. To avoid their censure he went to Paris, and resided at the French court for a year. On his return to Geneva he was summoned before the consistory and was imprisoned for a week. From this time his life became more and more nomadic. He traveled to Basel, Heidelberg, Vienna, and Pest. He also spent time in Paris and other regions in France. These journeys were undertaken partly in the hope of procuring patrons and purchasers, for the large sums which he had spent on such publications as the Thesaurus and the Plato of 1578 had almost ruined him. He published a concordance of the New Testament in 1594.

After visiting the University of Montpellier, where Isaac Casaubon, his son-in-law, was now professor, he started for Paris. He was taken ill in Lyon, and died there at the end of January 1598.

== Family ==
Henri Estienne was married three times. He married Marguerite Pillot in 1555, Barbe de Wille in 1556, and Abigail Pouppart in 1586. Estienne had fourteen children, three of whom survived him. His daughter was married to Isaac Casaubon. His son Paul (born 1567) assumed control of the presses in Geneva with Casaubon but he fled to Paris from the authorities. Paul's son Antoine became "Printer to the King" in Paris and "Guardian of the Greek Matrices"; however his death in 1674 ended the nearly two-century-long Estienne printing business.

== Legacy ==
Henri Estienne is considered by some scholars to be the most prominent printer in the Estienne family. Estienne was one of the "greatest and last scholarly editors and publishers of the Renaissance."

== See also ==
- Stephanus pagination
- Jean de Serres, collaborator on Plato edition
- Comparison of Ancient Greek dictionaries
