= Darbres =

- Commune
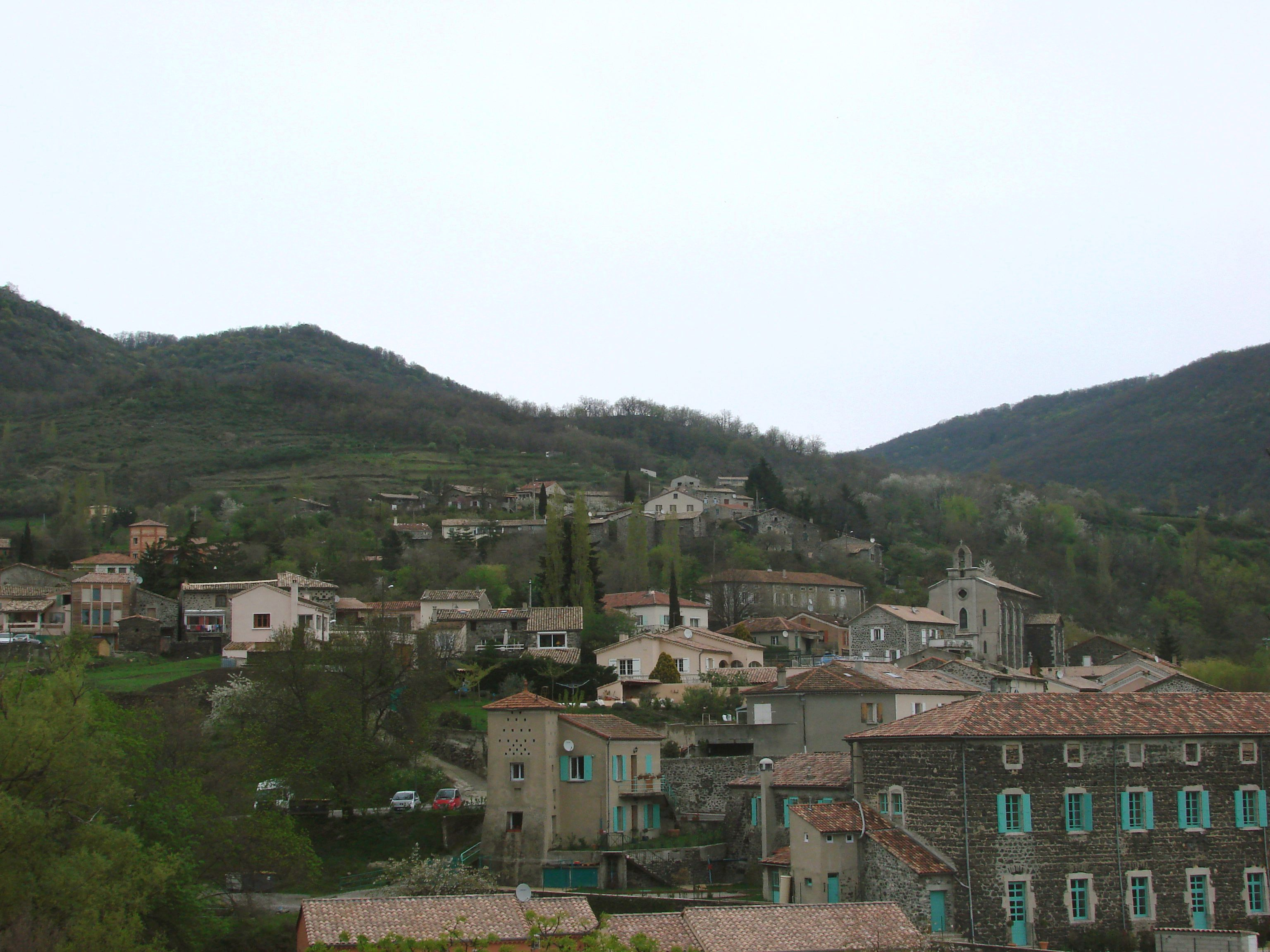
- A general view of Darbres
- Location of Darbres
- Location within France Location within Auvergne-Rhône-Alpes
- Coordinates: 44°38′55″N 4°30′19″E
- Country: France
- Region: Auvergne-Rhône-Alpes
- Department: Ardèche
- Arrondissement: Largentière
- Canton: Berg-Helvie
- Intercommunality: Berg et Coiron

Government
  - Mayor (2023–2026): Michaël Cros
- Area^{1}: 16.52 km^{2} (6.38 sq mi)
- Elevation: 450 m (1,480 ft)
- Highest elevation: 880 m (2,890 ft)
- Lowest elevation: 337 m (1,106 ft)
- Population (2023): 272
  - Density: 16.5/km^{2} (42.6/sq mi)
- Time zone: UTC+01:00 (CET)
  - Summer (DST): UTC+02:00 (CEST)
- INSEE/Postal code: 07077 /07170
- ^{1} French Land Register data, which excludes lakes, ponds, glaciers > 1 km^{2} (0.386 sq mi or 247 acres) and river estuaries.

Darbres (French pronunciation: [daʁbʁ]; Occitan: Arbres) is a commune in the Ardèche department in southern France.

== Population ==
Historical population
Year	Pop.	±% p.a.
1968	190	—
1975	190	+0.00%
1982	168	−1.74%
1990	213	+3.01%
1999	212	−0.05%
2007	247	+1.93%
2012	229	−1.50%
2017	248	+1.61%
2023	272	+1.55%
Source: INSEE

== See also ==
- Communes of the Ardèche department
