= Saint-Gineys-en-Coiron =

- Commune
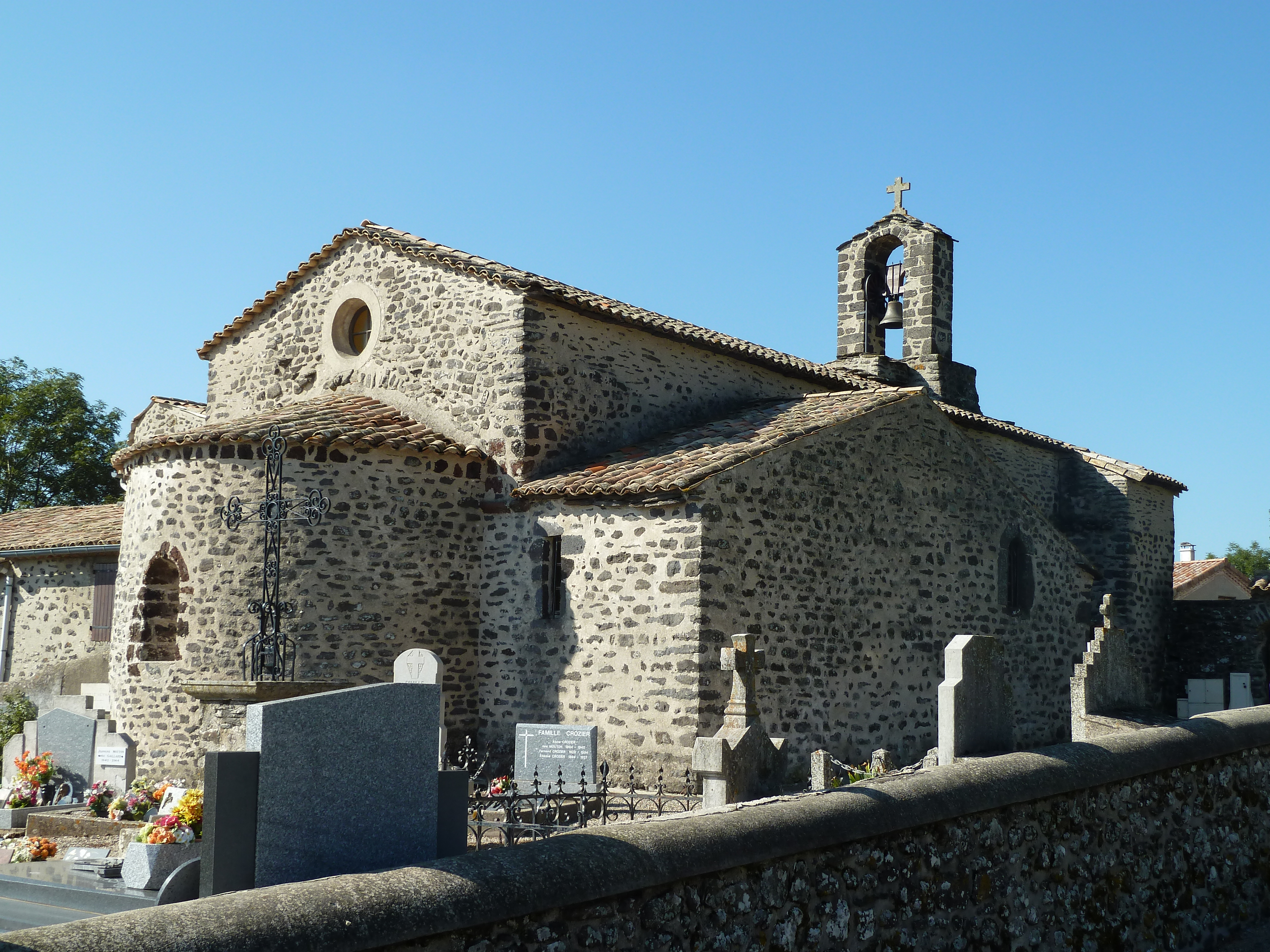
- The church in Saint-Gineys-en-Coiron
- Location of Saint-Gineys-en-Coiron
- Location within France Location within Auvergne-Rhône-Alpes
- Coordinates: 44°38′01″N 4°32′02″E
- Country: France
- Region: Auvergne-Rhône-Alpes
- Department: Ardèche
- Arrondissement: Largentière
- Canton: Berg-Helvie
- Intercommunality: Berg et Coiron

Government
  - Mayor (2020–2026): Jean-François Crozier
- Area^{1}: 13.2 km^{2} (5.1 sq mi)
- Elevation: 672 m (2,205 ft)
- Highest elevation: 775 m (2,543 ft)
- Lowest elevation: 386 m (1,266 ft)
- Population (2023): 125
  - Density: 9.47/km^{2} (24.5/sq mi)
- Time zone: UTC+01:00 (CET)
  - Summer (DST): UTC+02:00 (CEST)
- INSEE/Postal code: 07242 /07580
- ^{1} French Land Register data, which excludes lakes, ponds, glaciers > 1 km^{2} (0.386 sq mi or 247 acres) and river estuaries.

Saint-Gineys-en-Coiron (French pronunciation: [sɛ̃ ʒinɛ ɑ̃ kwaʁɔ̃]; before 2020: Saint-Gineis-en-Coiron; Occitan: Sant Gineis en Coiron) is a commune in the Ardèche department in southern France.

== Population ==
Historical population
Year	Pop.	±% p.a.
1968	121	—
1975	101	−2.55%
1982	78	−3.62%
1990	70	−1.34%
1999	96	+3.57%
2007	97	+0.13%
2012	109	+2.36%
2017	115	+1.08%
2023	125	+1.40%
Source: INSEE

== See also ==
- Communes of the Ardèche department
