= Lussas =

- Commune
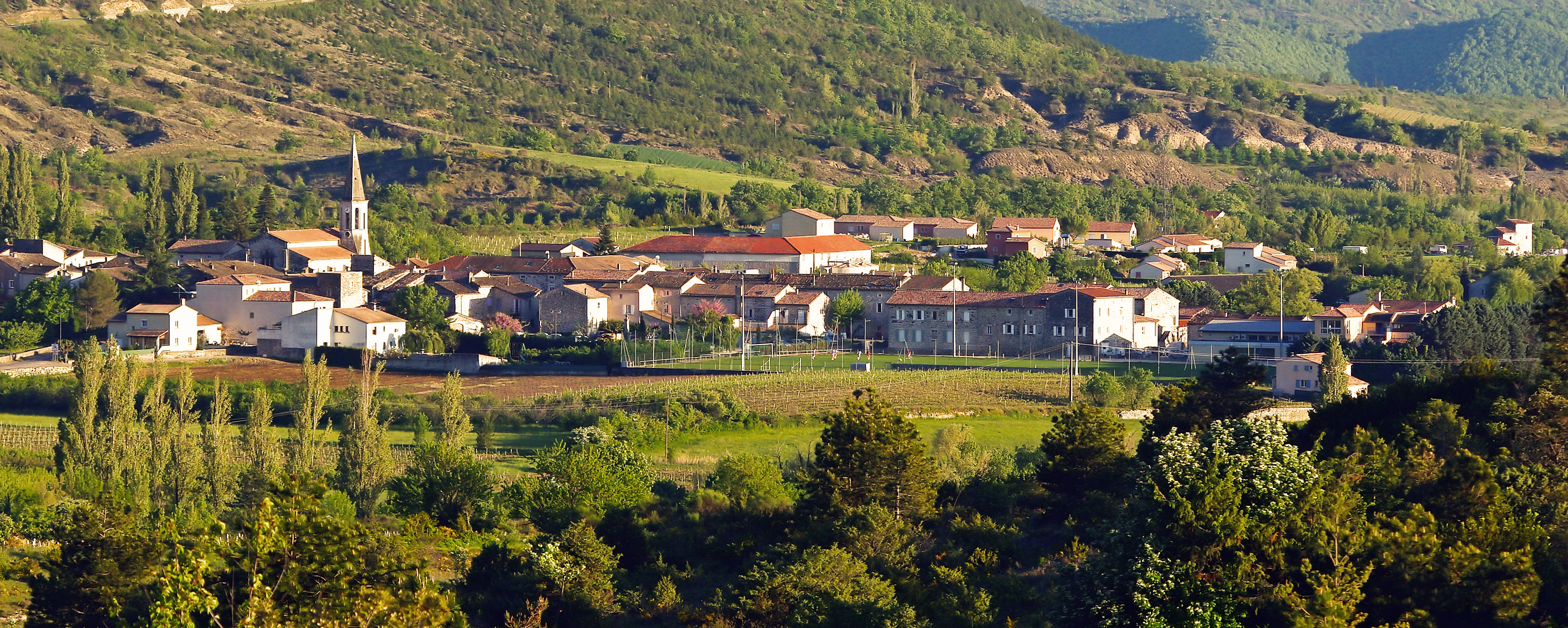
- A general view of Lussas
- Location of Lussas
- Location within France Location within Auvergne-Rhône-Alpes
- Coordinates: 44°36′46″N 4°28′25″E
- Country: France
- Region: Auvergne-Rhône-Alpes
- Department: Ardèche
- Arrondissement: Largentière
- Canton: Berg-Helvie
- Intercommunality: Berg et Coiron

Government
  - Mayor (2022–2026): Claude Moncomble
- Area^{1}: 16.45 km^{2} (6.35 sq mi)
- Elevation: 270 m (890 ft)
- Highest elevation: 632 m (2,073 ft)
- Lowest elevation: 199 m (653 ft)
- Population (2023): 1,145
  - Density: 69.60/km^{2} (180.3/sq mi)
- Time zone: UTC+01:00 (CET)
  - Summer (DST): UTC+02:00 (CEST)
- INSEE/Postal code: 07145 /07170
- ^{1} French Land Register data, which excludes lakes, ponds, glaciers > 1 km^{2} (0.386 sq mi or 247 acres) and river estuaries.

Lussas (French pronunciation: [lysas]) is a commune in the Ardèche department in southern France.

== Population ==
Historical population
Year	Pop.	±% p.a.
1968	561	—
1975	529	−0.84%
1982	585	+1.45%
1990	624	+0.81%
1999	776	+2.45%
2007	910	+2.01%
2012	1,067	+3.23%
2017	1,159	+1.67%
2023	1,145	−0.20%
Source: INSEE

== See also ==
- Communes of the Ardèche department
