= Berzème =

- Commune
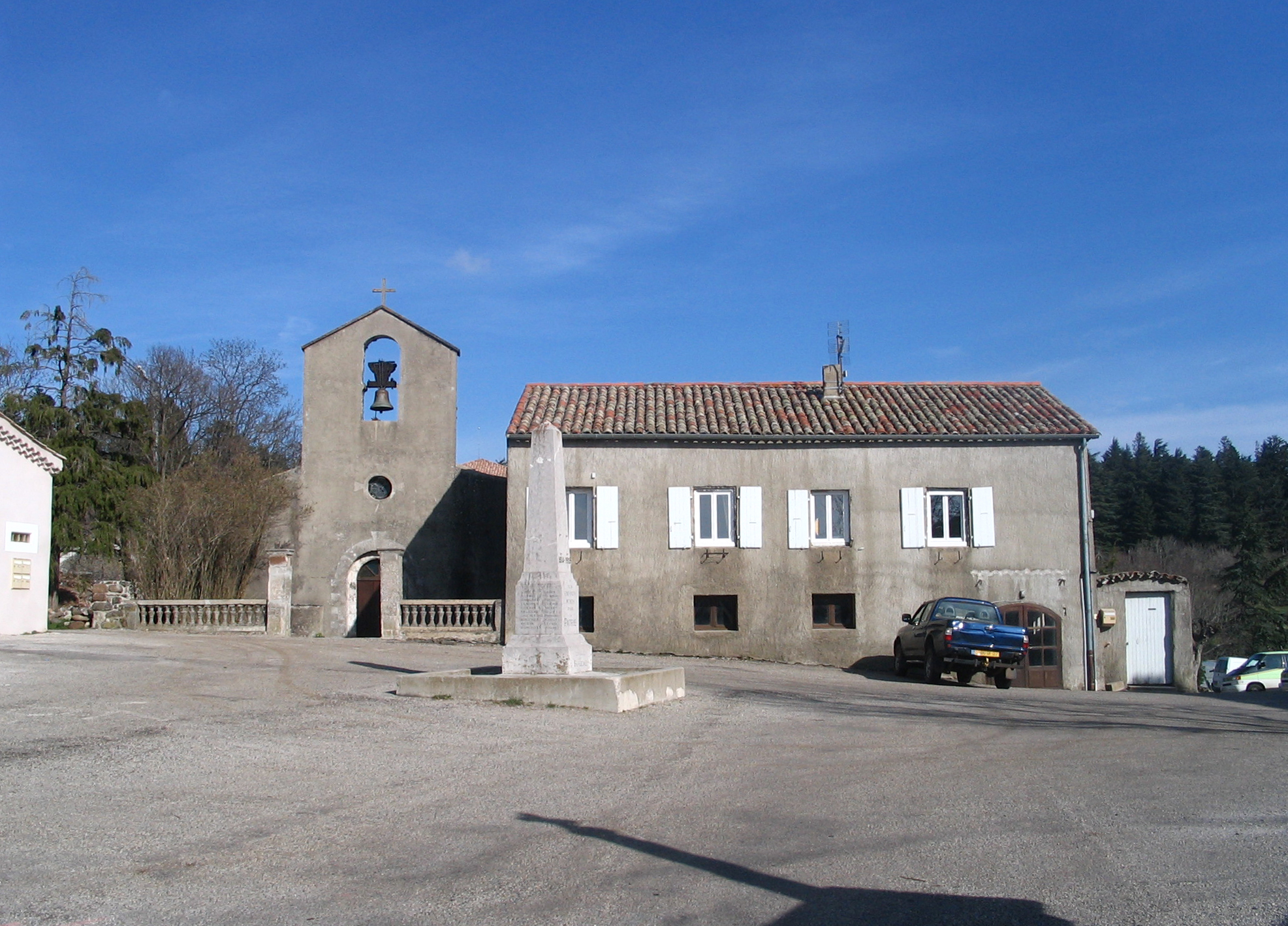
- The main square in Berzème
- Location of Berzème
- Location within France Location within Auvergne-Rhône-Alpes
- Coordinates: 44°39′09″N 4°33′56″E
- Country: France
- Region: Auvergne-Rhône-Alpes
- Department: Ardèche
- Arrondissement: Largentière
- Canton: Berg-Helvie
- Intercommunality: Berg et Coiron

Government
  - Mayor (2020–2026): Yannick Guénard
- Area^{1}: 18.36 km^{2} (7.09 sq mi)
- Elevation: 730 m (2,400 ft)
- Highest elevation: 839 m (2,753 ft)
- Lowest elevation: 516 m (1,693 ft)
- Population (2023): 159
  - Density: 8.66/km^{2} (22.4/sq mi)
- Time zone: UTC+01:00 (CET)
  - Summer (DST): UTC+02:00 (CEST)
- INSEE/Postal code: 07032 /07580
- ^{1} French Land Register data, which excludes lakes, ponds, glaciers > 1 km^{2} (0.386 sq mi or 247 acres) and river estuaries.

Berzème (French pronunciation: [bɛʁzɛm]; Occitan: Bersèma) is a commune in the Ardèche department in southern France.

== Population ==
Historical population
Year	Pop.	±% p.a.
1968	173	—
1975	123	−4.76%
1982	131	+0.90%
1990	107	−2.50%
1999	135	+2.62%
2007	131	−0.38%
2012	163	+4.47%
2017	174	+1.31%
2023	159	−1.49%
Source: INSEE

== See also ==
- Communes of the Ardèche department
