= Saint-Laurent-sous-Coiron =

- Commune
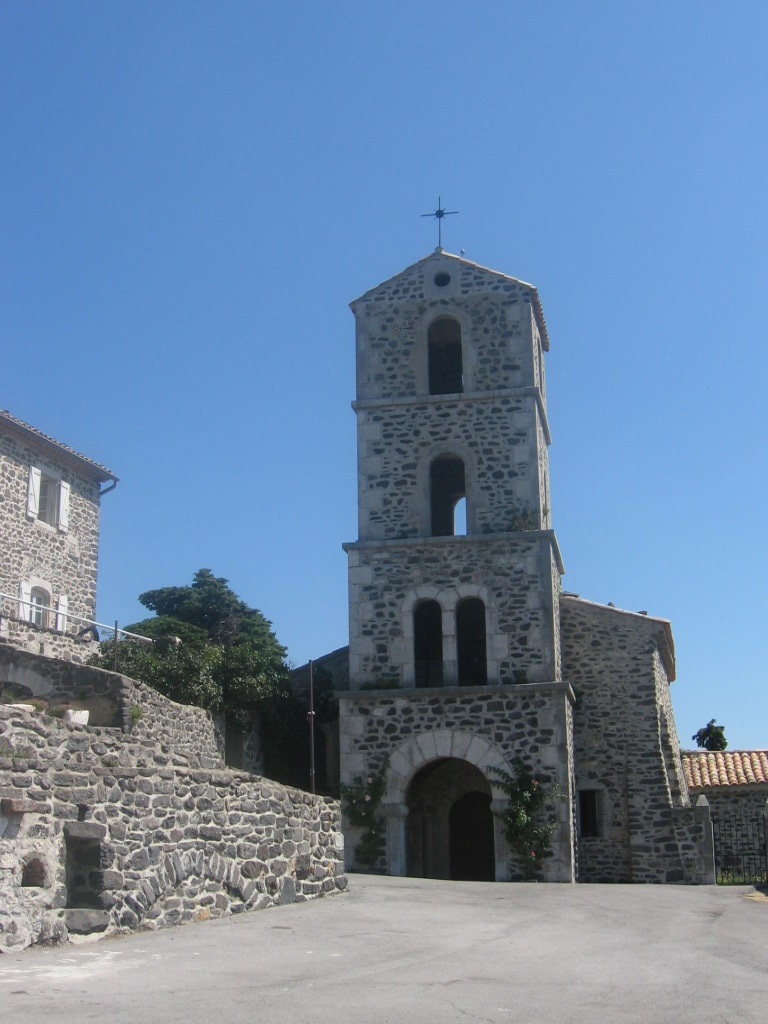
- The church in Saint-Laurent-sous-Coiron
- Location of Saint-Laurent-sous-Coiron
- Location within France Location within Auvergne-Rhône-Alpes
- Coordinates: 44°38′16″N 4°28′57″E
- Country: France
- Region: Auvergne-Rhône-Alpes
- Department: Ardèche
- Arrondissement: Largentière
- Canton: Berg-Helvie
- Intercommunality: Berg et Coiron

Government
  - Mayor (2020–2026): Michelle Gilly
- Area^{1}: 15.58 km^{2} (6.02 sq mi)
- Elevation: 540 m (1,770 ft)
- Highest elevation: 1,019 m (3,343 ft)
- Lowest elevation: 355 m (1,165 ft)
- Population (2023): 122
  - Density: 7.83/km^{2} (20.3/sq mi)
- Time zone: UTC+01:00 (CET)
  - Summer (DST): UTC+02:00 (CEST)
- INSEE/Postal code: 07263 /07170
- ^{1} French Land Register data, which excludes lakes, ponds, glaciers > 1 km^{2} (0.386 sq mi or 247 acres) and river estuaries.

Saint-Laurent-sous-Coiron (French pronunciation: [sɛ̃ loʁɑ̃ su kwaʁɔ̃]; Occitan: Sant Laurent sous Coiron) is a commune in the Ardèche department in southern France.

== Population ==
Historical population
Year	Pop.	±% p.a.
1968	112	—
1975	92	−2.77%
1982	120	+3.87%
1990	115	−0.53%
1999	132	+1.54%
2007	136	+0.37%
2012	105	−5.04%
2017	100	−0.97%
2023	122	+3.37%
Source: INSEE

== See also ==
- Communes of the Ardèche department
