= Ibie =

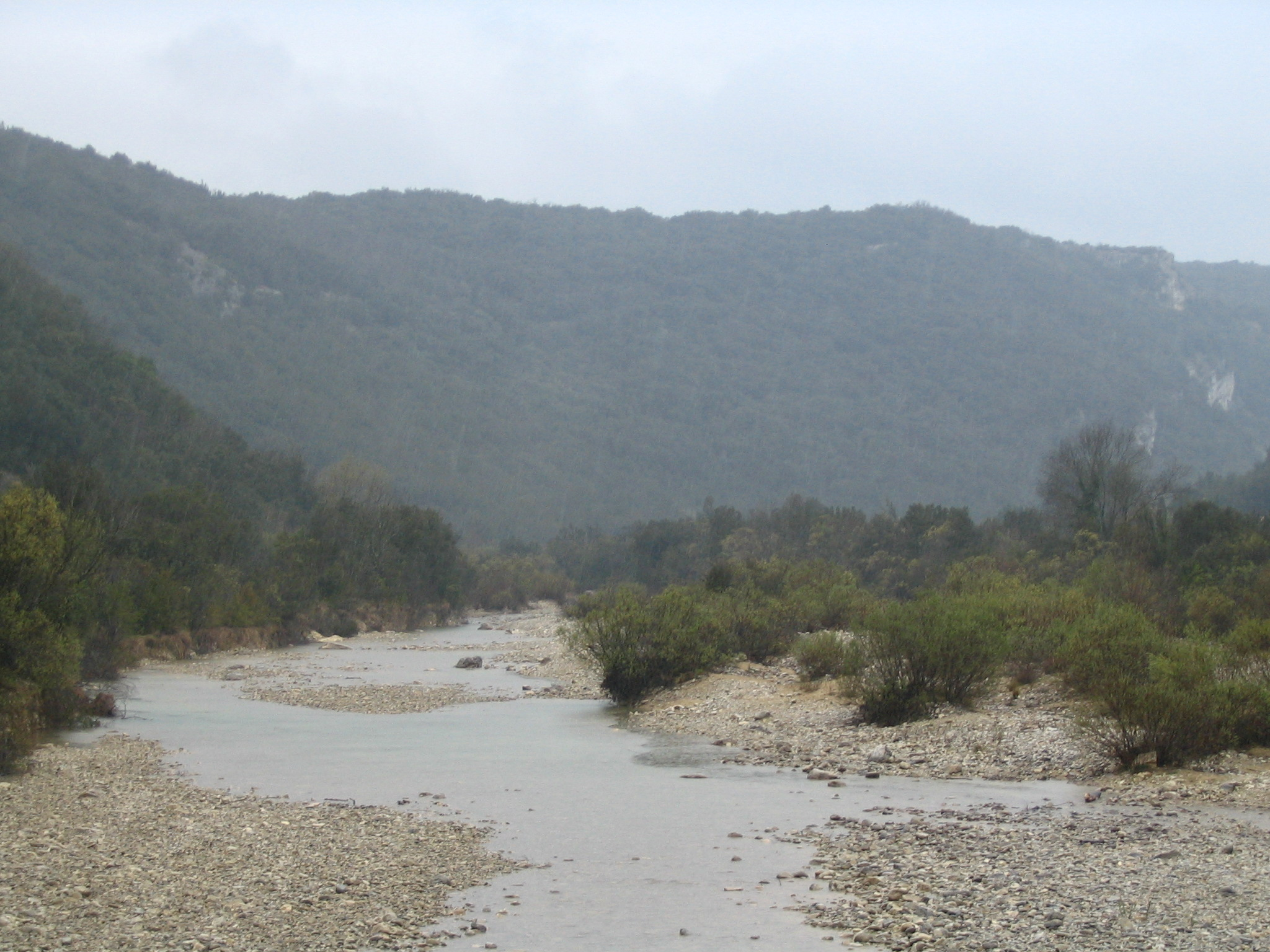
- The Ibie.

- Location within France Location within Auvergne-Rhône-Alpes

Location
- Country: France

Physical characteristics
- Source
  - location: Saint-Jean-le-Centenier
  - coordinates: 44°34′13″N 04°32′34″E
  - elevation: 400 m (1,300 ft)
- Mouth
  - location: Ardèche
  - coordinates: 44°23′36″N 04°23′59″E
  - elevation: 78 m (256 ft)
- Length: 33.1 km (20.6 mi)

Basin features
- Progression: Ardèche→ Rhône→ Mediterranean Sea

The Ibie is a 33.1 km (20.6 mi) long river in the Ardèche département, southeastern France. Its source is at Saint-Jean-le-Centenier, 2 km (1.2 mi) south of the village. It flows generally south-southwest, through the northern part of the Côtes du Vivarais AOC. It is a left tributary of the Ardèche into which it flows at Vallon-Pont-d'Arc, 1.8 km (1.1 mi) southeast of the village.

== Communes along its course ==
This list is ordered from source to mouth:

- Ardèche: Saint-Jean-le-Centenier, Villeneuve-de-Berg, Saint-Maurice-d'Ibie, Rochecolombe, Lagorce, Vallon-Pont-d'Arc
