= Saint-Germain, Ardèche =

Saint-Germain
- Commune
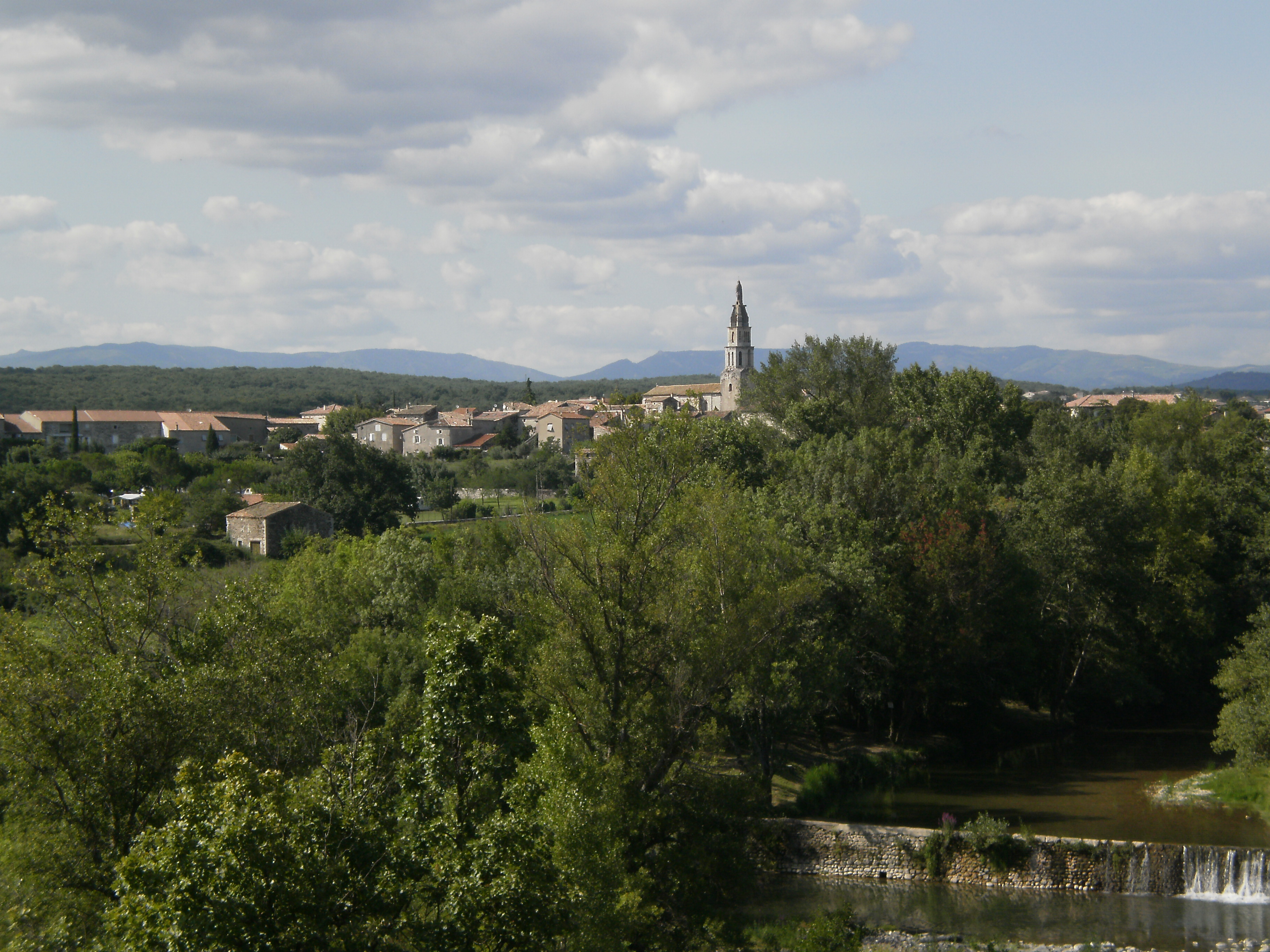
- A general view of Saint-Germain
- Location of Saint-Germain
- Location within France Location within Auvergne-Rhône-Alpes
- Coordinates: 44°33′20″N 4°27′04″E
- Country: France
- Region: Auvergne-Rhône-Alpes
- Department: Ardèche
- Arrondissement: Largentière
- Canton: Berg-Helvie

Government
  - Mayor (2020–2026): Joseph-Marie Fallot
- Area^{1}: 9.5 km^{2} (3.7 sq mi)
- Elevation: 195 m (640 ft)
- Highest elevation: 438 m (1,437 ft)
- Lowest elevation: 175 m (574 ft)
- Population (2023): 705
  - Density: 74/km^{2} (190/sq mi)
- Time zone: UTC+01:00 (CET)
  - Summer (DST): UTC+02:00 (CEST)
- INSEE/Postal code: 07241 /07170
- ^{1} French Land Register data, which excludes lakes, ponds, glaciers > 1 km^{2} (0.386 sq mi or 247 acres) and river estuaries.

Saint-Germain (French pronunciation: [sɛ̃ ʒɛʁmɛ̃]; Occitan: Sant Germain) is a commune in the Ardèche department in southern France.

== Population ==
Historical population
Year	Pop.	±% p.a.
1968	267	—
1975	212	−3.24%
1982	280	+4.05%
1990	340	+2.46%
1999	505	+4.49%
2007	613	+2.45%
2012	667	+1.70%
2017	710	+1.26%
2023	705	−0.12%
Source: INSEE

== See also ==
- Communes of the Ardèche department
