= Lagorce, Ardèche =

Lagorce
- Commune
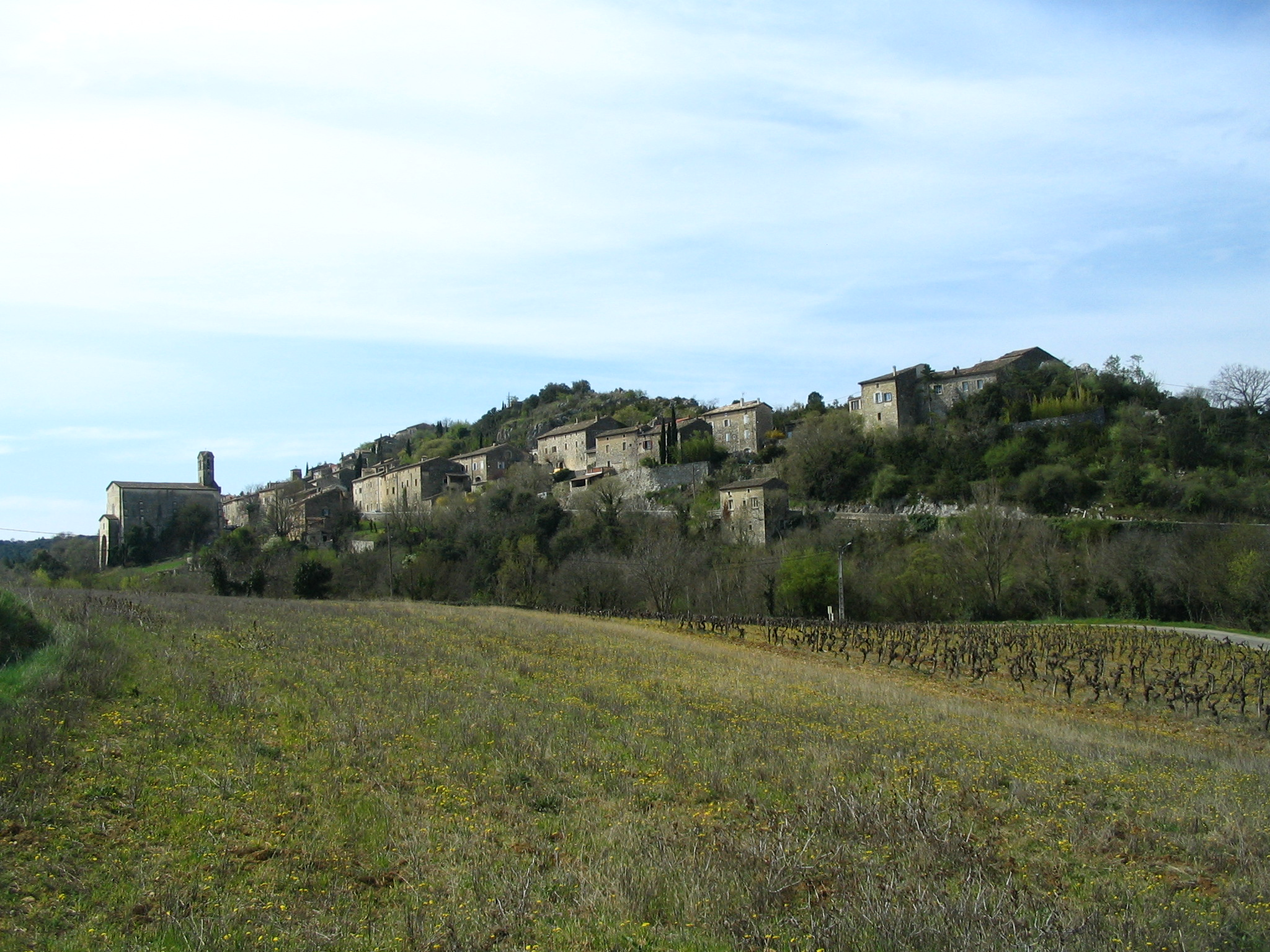
- A general view of Lagorce
- Location of Lagorce
- Location within France Location within Auvergne-Rhône-Alpes
- Coordinates: 44°26′55″N 4°25′05″E
- Country: France
- Region: Auvergne-Rhône-Alpes
- Department: Ardèche
- Arrondissement: Largentière
- Canton: Vallon-Pont-d'Arc

Government
  - Mayor (2024–2026): Bernard Chevilliat
- Area^{1}: 69.49 km^{2} (26.83 sq mi)
- Elevation: 130 m (430 ft)
- Highest elevation: 700 m (2,300 ft)
- Lowest elevation: 96 m (315 ft)
- Population (2023): 1,257
  - Density: 18.09/km^{2} (46.85/sq mi)
- Time zone: UTC+01:00 (CET)
  - Summer (DST): UTC+02:00 (CEST)
- INSEE/Postal code: 07126 /07150
- ^{1} French Land Register data, which excludes lakes, ponds, glaciers > 1 km^{2} (0.386 sq mi or 247 acres) and river estuaries.

Lagorce (French pronunciation: [laɡɔʁs]; Occitan: La Gòrça) is a commune in the Ardèche department in southern France.

== Geography ==
The village lies in the middle of the commune, on the right bank of the Salastre, a right tributary of the river Ibie, which flows south through the eastern part of the commune.

== Population ==
Historical population
Year	Pop.	±% p.a.
1968	488	—
1975	507	+0.55%
1982	602	+2.48%
1990	706	+2.01%
1999	700	−0.09%
2007	907	+3.29%
2012	1,081	+3.57%
2017	1,160	+1.42%
2023	1,257	+1.35%
Source: INSEE

== See also ==
- Côtes du Vivarais AOC
- Communes of the Ardèche department
