= Saint-Andéol-de-Berg =

- Commune
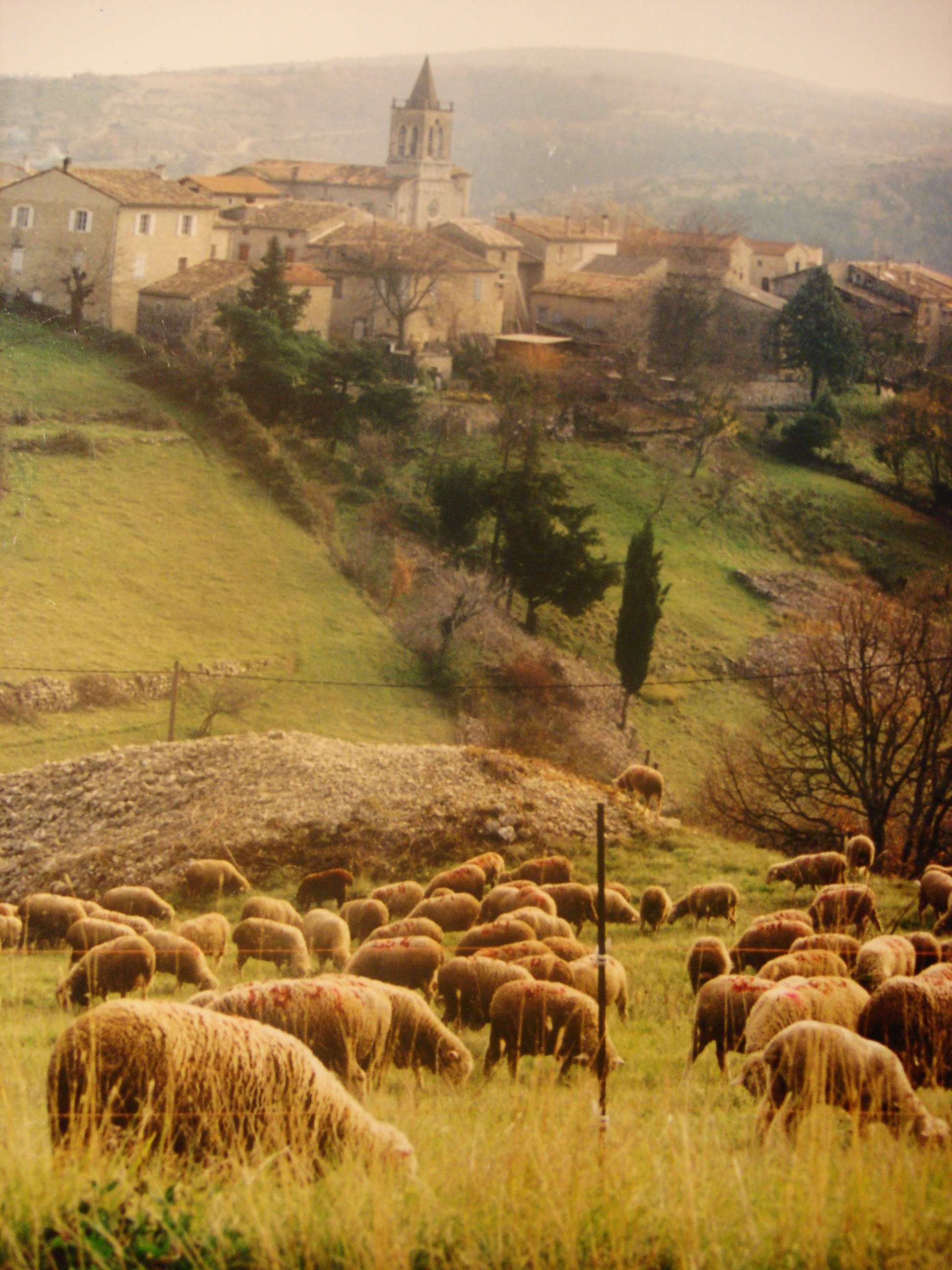
- Sheep grazing outside the village in 1997
- Location of Saint-Andéol-de-Berg
- Location within France Location within Auvergne-Rhône-Alpes
- Coordinates: 44°31′41″N 4°31′41″E
- Country: France
- Region: Auvergne-Rhône-Alpes
- Department: Ardèche
- Arrondissement: Largentière
- Canton: Berg-Helvie
- Intercommunality: Berg et Coiron

Government
  - Mayor (2020–2026): Didier Loyrion
- Area^{1}: 15.57 km^{2} (6.01 sq mi)
- Elevation: 375 m (1,230 ft)
- Highest elevation: 524 m (1,719 ft)
- Lowest elevation: 262 m (860 ft)
- Population (2023): 134
  - Density: 8.61/km^{2} (22.3/sq mi)
- Time zone: UTC+01:00 (CET)
  - Summer (DST): UTC+02:00 (CEST)
- INSEE/Postal code: 07208 /07170
- ^{1} French Land Register data, which excludes lakes, ponds, glaciers > 1 km^{2} (0.386 sq mi or 247 acres) and river estuaries.

Saint-Andéol-de-Berg (French pronunciation: [sɛ̃t‿ɑ̃deɔl də bɛʁ]; Occitan: Sant Andiòu de Bèrc) is a commune in the Ardèche department in the Auvergne-Rhône-Alpes region in southern France.

== Population ==
Historical population
Year	Pop.	±% p.a.
1968	87	—
1975	50	−7.61%
1982	85	+7.88%
1990	99	+1.92%
1999	94	−0.57%
2007	126	+3.73%
2012	128	+0.32%
2017	123	−0.79%
2023	134	+1.44%
Source: INSEE

== See also ==
- Communes of the Ardèche department
