= Rochecolombe =

Rochecolombe Ròchacolomba (Occitan)
- Commune
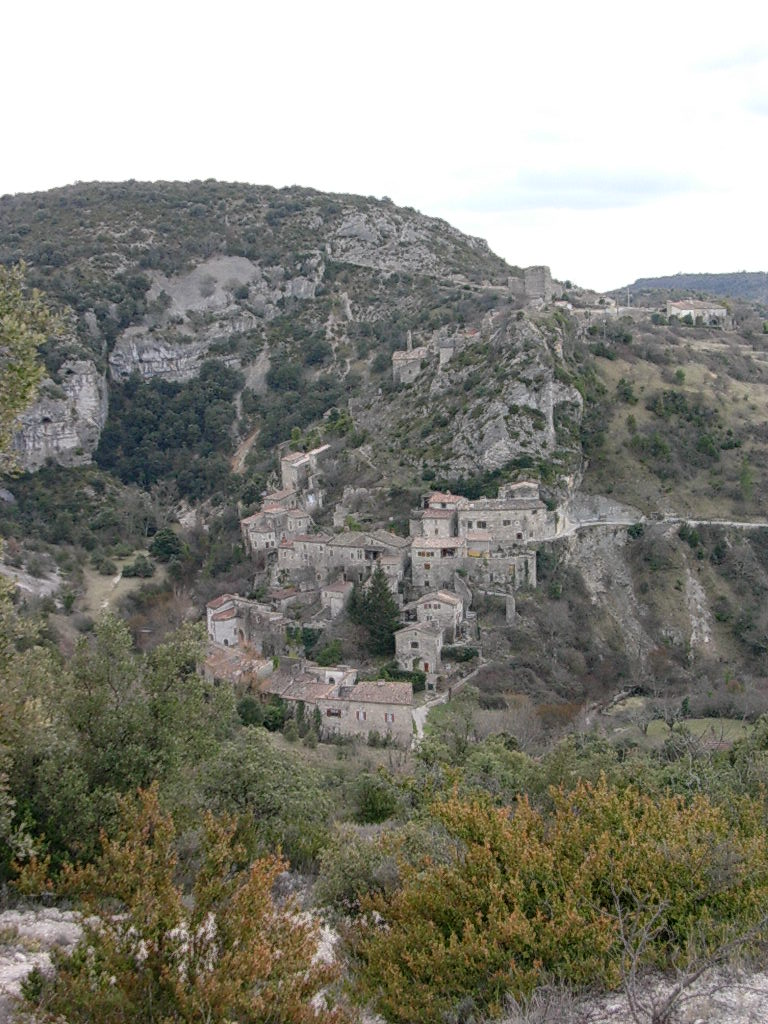
- The old village and château
- Location of Rochecolombe
- Location within France Location within Auvergne-Rhône-Alpes
- Coordinates: 44°31′06″N 4°26′10″E
- Country: France
- Region: Auvergne-Rhône-Alpes
- Department: Ardèche
- Arrondissement: Largentière
- Canton: Vallon-Pont-d'Arc
- Intercommunality: CC des Gorges de l'Ardèche

Government
  - Mayor (2020–2026): Jean-Yvon Mauduit
- Area^{1}: 21.5 km^{2} (8.3 sq mi)
- Elevation: 187 m (614 ft)
- Highest elevation: 440 m (1,440 ft)
- Lowest elevation: 159 m (522 ft)
- Population (2023): 227
  - Density: 10.6/km^{2} (27.3/sq mi)
- Demonym: Rochecolombins
- Time zone: UTC+01:00 (CET)
  - Summer (DST): UTC+02:00 (CEST)
- INSEE/Postal code: 07190 /07200
- Website: rochecolombe.fr
- ^{1} French Land Register data, which excludes lakes, ponds, glaciers > 1 km^{2} (0.386 sq mi or 247 acres) and river estuaries.

Rochecolombe (French pronunciation: [ʁɔʃkɔlɔ̃b]; Occitan: Ròchacolomba) is a commune in the Ardèche department in southern France.

== Geography ==
The river Ibie forms most of the commune's eastern border.

== Population ==
Historical population
Year	Pop.	±% p.a.
1968	178	—
1975	139	−3.47%
1982	167	+2.66%
1990	131	−2.99%
1999	170	+2.94%
2007	217	+3.10%
2012	237	+1.78%
2017	211	−2.30%
2023	227	+1.23%
Source: INSEE

== See also ==
- Communes of the Ardèche department
