= Saint-Pons, Ardèche =

Saint-Pons
- Commune
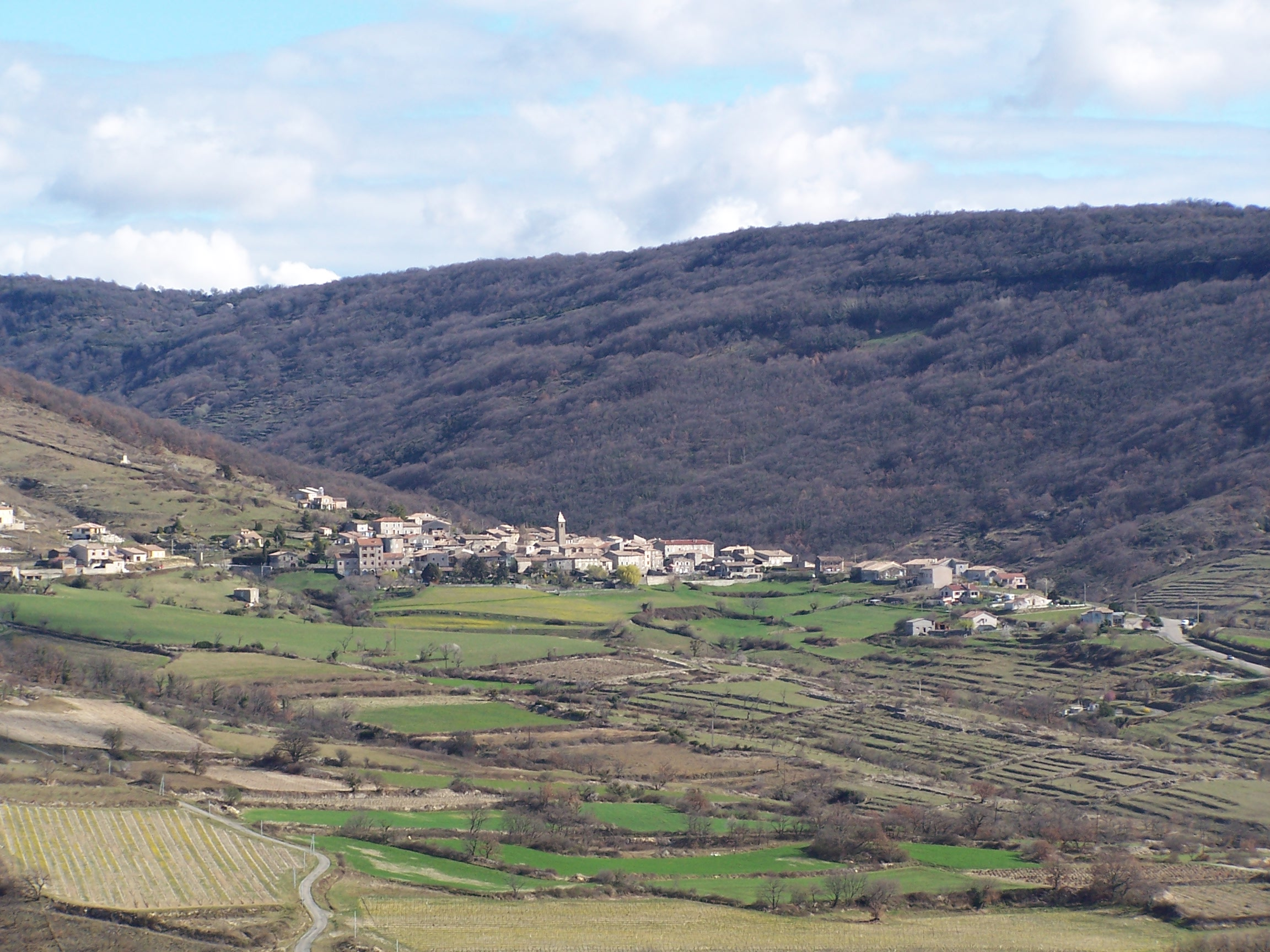
- A general view of Saint-Pons
- Location of Saint-Pons
- Location within France Location within Auvergne-Rhône-Alpes
- Coordinates: 44°35′41″N 4°34′38″E
- Country: France
- Region: Auvergne-Rhône-Alpes
- Department: Ardèche
- Arrondissement: Largentière
- Canton: Berg-Helvie
- Intercommunality: Berg et Coiron

Government
  - Mayor (2020–2026): Dominique Laville
- Area^{1}: 16.5 km^{2} (6.4 sq mi)
- Elevation: 300 m (980 ft)
- Highest elevation: 683 m (2,241 ft)
- Lowest elevation: 214 m (702 ft)
- Population (2023): 308
  - Density: 18.7/km^{2} (48.3/sq mi)
- Time zone: UTC+01:00 (CET)
  - Summer (DST): UTC+02:00 (CEST)
- INSEE/Postal code: 07287 /07580
- ^{1} French Land Register data, which excludes lakes, ponds, glaciers > 1 km^{2} (0.386 sq mi or 247 acres) and river estuaries.

Saint-Pons (French pronunciation: [sɛ̃ pɔ̃s]; Occitan: Sant Ponç) is a commune in the Ardèche department in southern France.

== Population ==
Historical population
Year	Pop.	±% p.a.
1968	184	—
1975	175	−0.71%
1982	170	−0.41%
1990	181	+0.79%
1999	203	+1.28%
2007	256	+2.94%
2012	280	+1.81%
2017	293	+0.91%
2023	308	+0.84%
Source: INSEE

== See also ==
- Communes of the Ardèche department
