= Saint-Jean-le-Centenier =

- Commune
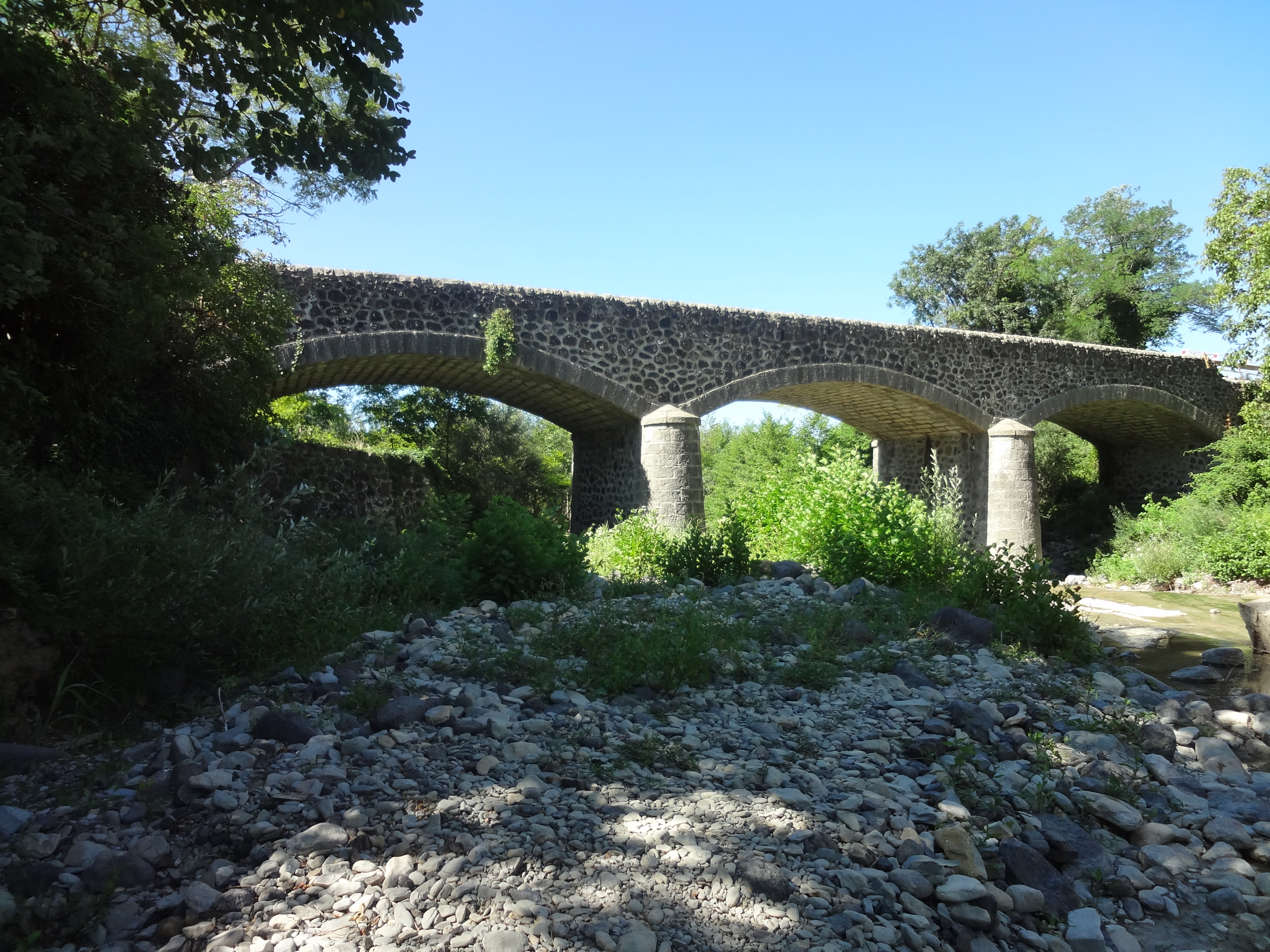
- The old bridge over the Claduègne, in Saint-Jean-le-Centenier
- Location of Saint-Jean-le-Centenier
- Location within France Location within Auvergne-Rhône-Alpes
- Coordinates: 44°35′31″N 4°32′09″E
- Country: France
- Region: Auvergne-Rhône-Alpes
- Department: Ardèche
- Arrondissement: Largentière
- Canton: Berg-Helvie
- Intercommunality: Berg et Coiron

Government
  - Mayor (2020–2026): Driss Naji
- Area^{1}: 15.16 km^{2} (5.85 sq mi)
- Elevation: 307 m (1,007 ft)
- Highest elevation: 578 m (1,896 ft)
- Lowest elevation: 256 m (840 ft)
- Population (2023): 871
  - Density: 57.5/km^{2} (149/sq mi)
- Time zone: UTC+01:00 (CET)
  - Summer (DST): UTC+02:00 (CEST)
- INSEE/Postal code: 07247 /07580
- ^{1} French Land Register data, which excludes lakes, ponds, glaciers > 1 km^{2} (0.386 sq mi or 247 acres) and river estuaries.

Saint-Jean-le-Centenier (French pronunciation: [sɛ̃ ʒɑ̃ lə sɑ̃tənje]; Occitan: Sant Joan lo Centenièr) is a commune in the Ardèche department in southern France.

== Geography ==
The river Ibie has its source in the southern part of the commune.

== Population ==
Historical population
Year	Pop.	±% p.a.
1968	565	—
1975	507	−1.54%
1982	544	+1.01%
1990	508	−0.85%
1999	573	+1.35%
2007	634	+1.27%
2012	686	+1.59%
2017	776	+2.50%
2023	871	+1.94%
Source: INSEE

== See also ==
- Communes of the Ardèche department
