= Villeneuve-de-Berg =

- Commune
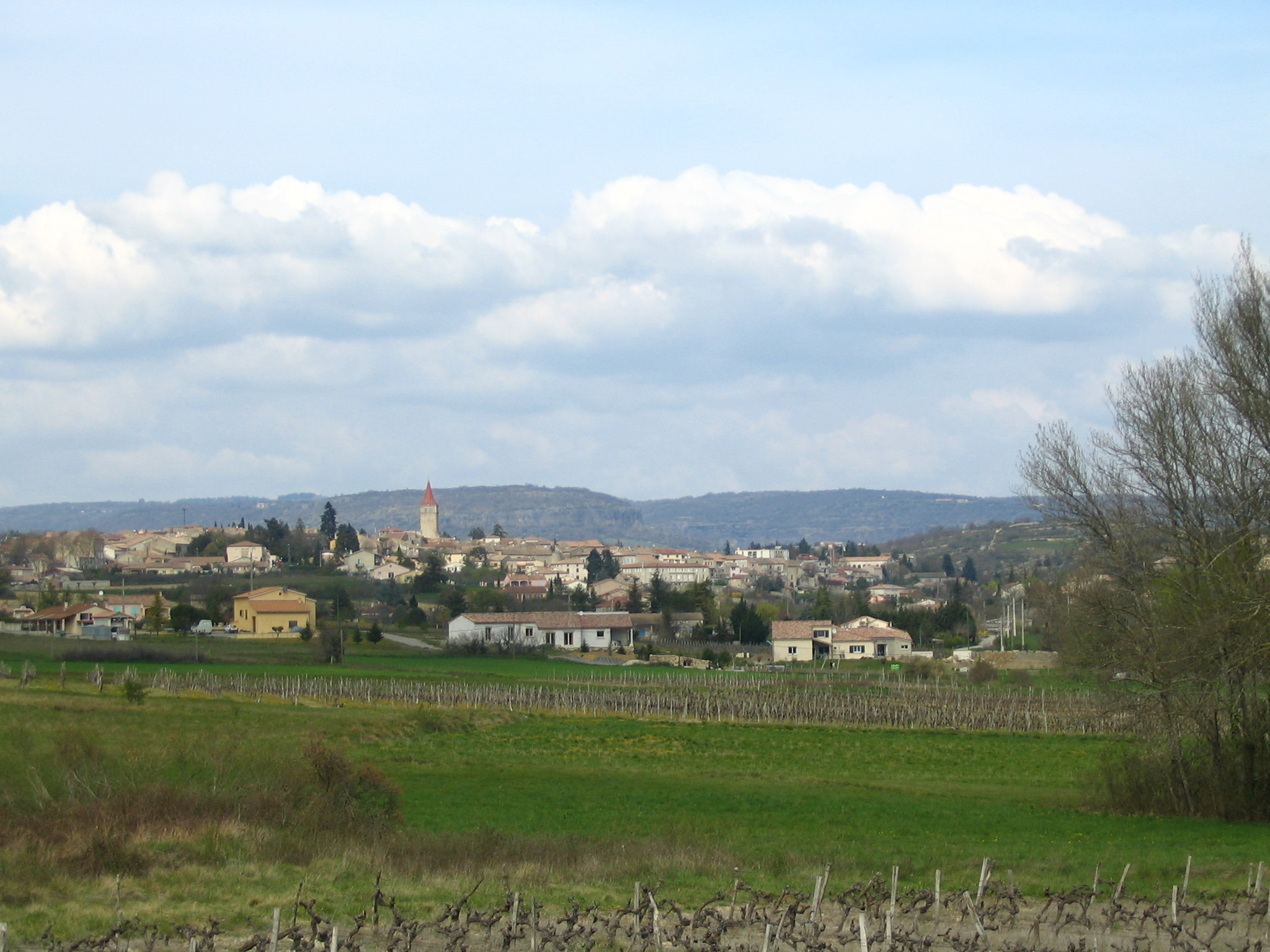
- A general view of Villeneuve-de-Berg

- Coat of arms
- Location of Villeneuve-de-Berg
- Location within France Location within Auvergne-Rhône-Alpes
- Coordinates: 44°33′28″N 4°30′10″E
- Country: France
- Region: Auvergne-Rhône-Alpes
- Department: Ardèche
- Arrondissement: Largentière
- Canton: Berg-Helvie
- Intercommunality: Berg et Coiron

Government
  - Mayor (2020–2026): Sylvie Dubois
- Area^{1}: 24.61 km^{2} (9.50 sq mi)
- Elevation: 320 m (1,050 ft)
- Highest elevation: 494 m (1,621 ft)
- Lowest elevation: 208 m (682 ft)
- Population (2023): 3,031
  - Density: 123.2/km^{2} (319.0/sq mi)
- Time zone: UTC+01:00 (CET)
  - Summer (DST): UTC+02:00 (CEST)
- INSEE/Postal code: 07341 /07170
- ^{1} French Land Register data, which excludes lakes, ponds, glaciers > 1 km^{2} (0.386 sq mi or 247 acres) and river estuaries.

Villeneuve-de-Berg (French pronunciation: [vilnœv də bɛʁ]; Occitan: Vilanòva de Bèrc) is a commune in the Ardèche department in southern France.

== Geography ==
The village lies in the north central part of the commune, on the right bank of the river Ibie, which flows southward through the commune.

== Population ==
Historical population
Year	Pop.	±% p.a.
1968	1,501	—
1975	1,624	+1.13%
1982	1,992	+2.96%
1990	2,290	+1.76%
1999	2,429	+0.66%
2007	2,858	+2.05%
2012	2,871	+0.09%
2017	2,944	+0.50%
2023	3,031	+0.49%
Source: INSEE

== See also ==
- Communes of the Ardèche department
