= Saint-Martin-d'Ardèche =

- Commune
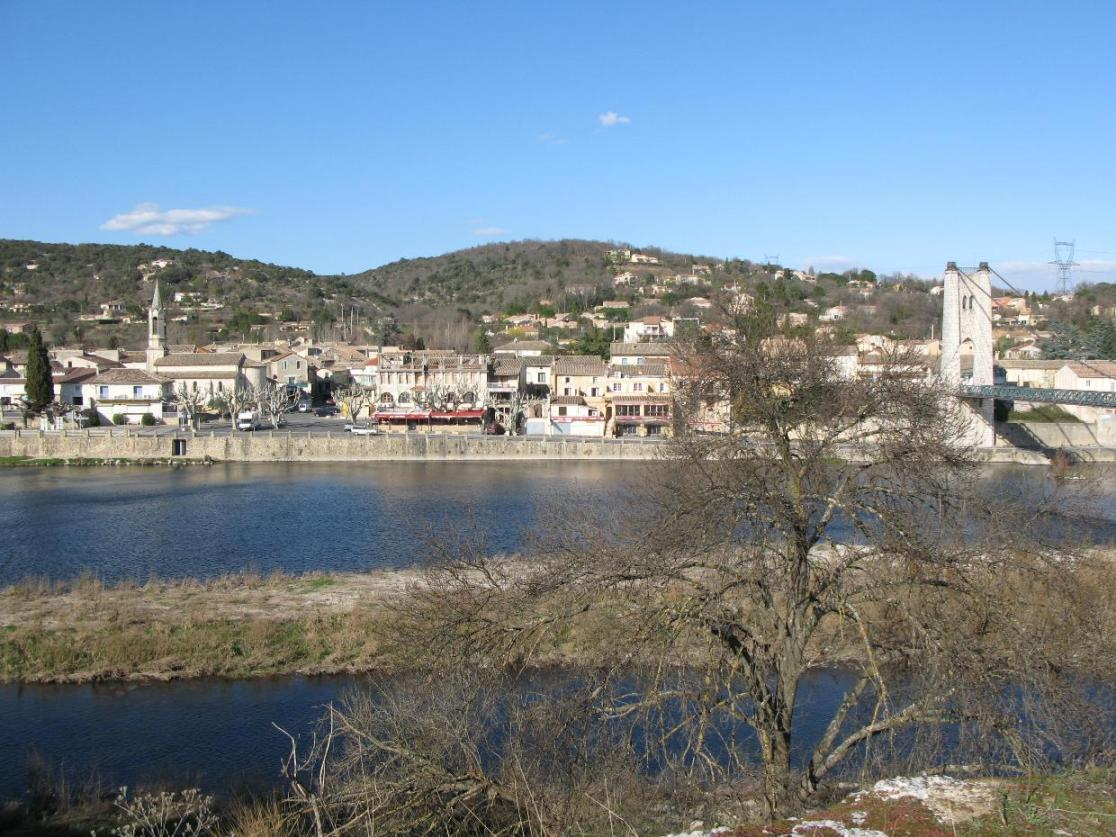
- The river Ardèche
- Location of Saint-Martin-d'Ardèche
- Location within France Location within Auvergne-Rhône-Alpes
- Coordinates: 44°18′16″N 4°33′59″E
- Country: France
- Region: Auvergne-Rhône-Alpes
- Department: Ardèche
- Arrondissement: Privas
- Canton: Bourg-Saint-Andéol
- Intercommunality: CC du Rhône aux Gorges de l'Ardèche

Government
  - Mayor (2022–2026): Daniel Archambault
- Area^{1}: 5.53 km^{2} (2.14 sq mi)
- Elevation: 46 m (151 ft)
- Highest elevation: 210 m (690 ft)
- Lowest elevation: 41 m (135 ft)
- Population (2023): 979
  - Density: 177/km^{2} (459/sq mi)
- Time zone: UTC+01:00 (CET)
  - Summer (DST): UTC+02:00 (CEST)
- INSEE/Postal code: 07268 /07700
- ^{1} French Land Register data, which excludes lakes, ponds, glaciers > 1 km^{2} (0.386 sq mi or 247 acres) and river estuaries.

Saint-Martin-d'Ardèche (French pronunciation: [sɛ̃ maʁtɛ̃ daʁdɛʃ]; Occitan: Sant Martin d'Ardecha) is a commune in the department of Ardèche in Southern France.

Saint-Martin-d'Ardèche is situated at the Southern entrance of the Ardèche Canyon, the Gorges de l'Ardèche.

== Administration ==
Saint-Martin-d'Ardèche is member of the intercommunality of Rhône aux Gorges de l'Ardèche together with nearby Ardèche communes of Bidon, Bourg-Saint-Andéol, Gras, Larnas, Saint-Montan, Saint-Just, Saint-Marcel-d'Ardèche, Saint-Remèze and Viviers at the very south-eastern end of department.

== Population ==
Historical population
Year	Pop.	±% p.a.
1968	365	—
1975	336	−1.18%
1982	380	+1.77%
1990	537	+4.42%
1999	642	+2.00%
2007	834	+3.32%
2012	942	+2.47%
2017	979	+0.77%
2023	979	+0.00%
Source: INSEE

== Geography ==
A few kilometres from the main trail of the Rhône Valley between Northern Europe and the Mediterranean coast, a Gateway to Provence, Saint-Martin-d'Ardèche lies underneath the silhouette of medieval Aiguèze at the outlet of the Ardèche Gorges carved through the limestone plateau de Gras (average 300 m high, culminating at the 719 m high Dent de Rez, i.e. saw tooth) (reïsse=saw in provençal). About 30 km (19 mi) between Vallon-Pont-d'Arc with the magnificent natural stone arch on the river and Saint-Martin-d'Ardèche. Since 1960, a panoramic road follows the canyon up the hill through the garrigue, the common Mediterranean vegetation when arriving from the North, and ends in Saint-Martin-d'Ardèche with a view of the river flowing towards the Rhône in the direction of the (Fuji-Yama silhouette) of the 1900 m high Mont Ventoux in Provence.

== History ==
Originally a settlement of peasants, fishermen and boatmen at a ford on the river, Petra and/or Sant Martin de la Peyre (St. Martin of the rocks) belonged over the centuries to the baronets of Aiguèze, whose fortress overlooked the whole valley down to the delta of Ardèche into the Rhône, at the time in the duchy of Uzès. It only became a separate commune after the French Revolution, when Départements were created with the river here as the border: Aiguèze in département Gard, Saint-Martin-de-la-Pierre as Saint-Martin-d'Ardèche in département Ardèche.

Its location on a ford had made the village an early stop for pilgrims and travellers. A church was built in the 11th and 12th centuries (up to the 19th-century bell tower). The river would finally be spanned by a stone bridge built in 1895 - which would be destroyed five years later by one of the furious swellings the Ardèche was accustomed to after autumn rains, before it would be regulated and dammed in the Cévennes. In September 1900, the bridge collapsed and was replaced in 1905 by a hanging bridge.

The economy of the village was mainly agricultural during the 19th and early 20th centuries which comprised silkworms, fruit, wine, wood floating and charcoal transport on the river, plus fishing. Change occurred in the second half of the 20th century with the transformation of the nearby Rhône Valley with the construction of the canal on the Rhône, atomic industries in Marcoule by Bagnols-sur-Cèze and Eurodif in Pierrelatte, the A7 highway from Lyon to Spain and the French Riviera, plus the TGV railway construction. The local economy is now based on wine and tourism. The southern Côtes du Rhône vineyards and Kayak and camping trips down the gorge are common in summer. Saint-Martin-d'Ardèche at the crossroads of four départements, Ardèche, Gard, Drôme, Vaucluse, with its river beaches, canoe trips, hiking and riding on the surrounding hills, plus historical towns and villages nearby, megalithic sites with dolmens, caves, medieval chapels, Renaissance buildings etc, provide a tourist gateway to Provence.

== Tourism ==
Situated less than 200 km (120 mi) south of Lyon, 50 km (31 mi) northwest of Avignon, 70 km (43 mi) northeast of Nîmes, 50 km from the Roman Pont du Gard), and 110 km (68 mi) from Mediterranean sea, Saint-Martin-d'Ardèche offers, with nearby Aiguèze (mainly in the high season from March to November),

- 3 hotels
- 7 campsites
- several guest houses, B&B, gîtes and chambres d'hôtes
- several restaurants
- canoe and kayak rental

Nearby sites:

- Aven d'Orgnac in Orgnac-l'Aven
- Caves like Grottes de Saint-Marcel on the Route Touristique de Gorges
- Dolmens (Champvermeil in Bidon, Pradèches in Saint-Marcel - or near the Botanic Path at the Grottes de Saint-Marcel with a menhir,...)
- Roman sites of Alba-la-Romaine, Roman bridge on the Escoutaÿ river in Viviers
- Mediaeval villages with burg ruins : Aiguèze labelled one of the "Most Beautiful Villages of France", Saint-Montan
- Mediaeval isolated church of Larnas, chapels St-Sulpice in Saint-Marcel d'Ardèche, Ste-Agnès in Saint-Paulet-de-Caisson,...
- Mediaeval and Renaissance town centers in Bourg-Saint-Andéol, Viviers see, Pont-Saint-Esprit with its 13th-century stonebridge over the Rhône at the confluence of Ardèche, Saint-Paul-Trois-Châteaux and castles of Suze-la-Rousse or Mme de Sévigné's daughter Grignan
- La Ferme aux Crocodiles in Pierrelatte

== See also ==
- Communes of the Ardèche department
