= Bourg-Saint-Andéol =

- Commune
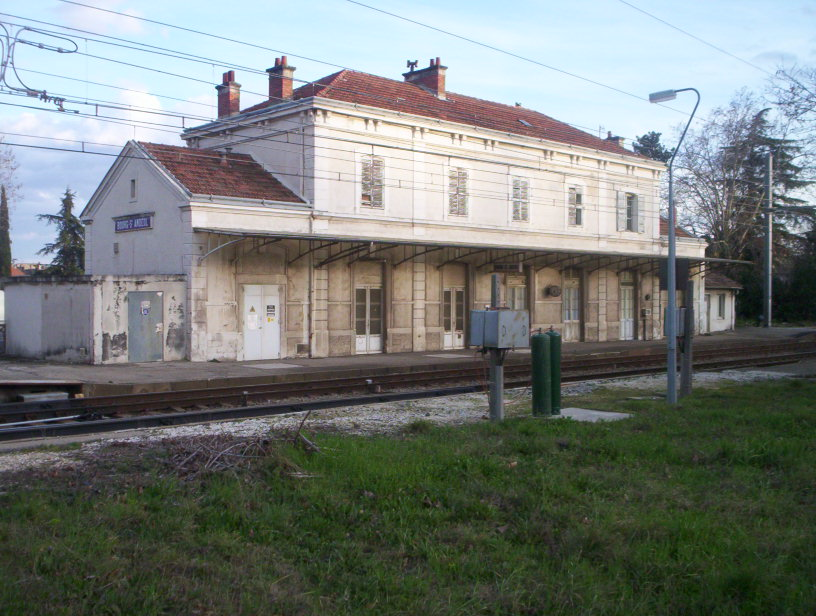
- The railway station

- Coat of arms
- Location of Bourg-Saint-Andéol
- Location within France Location within Auvergne-Rhône-Alpes
- Coordinates: 44°26′54″N 4°35′56″E
- Country: France
- Region: Auvergne-Rhône-Alpes
- Department: Ardèche
- Arrondissement: Privas
- Canton: Bourg-Saint-Andéol

Government
  - Mayor (2020–2026): Françoise Gonnet-Tabardel
- Area^{1}: 43.74 km^{2} (16.89 sq mi)
- Elevation: 70 m (230 ft)
- Population (2023): 7,661
  - Density: 175.1/km^{2} (453.6/sq mi)
- Time zone: UTC+01:00 (CET)
  - Summer (DST): UTC+02:00 (CEST)
- INSEE/Postal code: 07042 /07700
- ^{1} French Land Register data, which excludes lakes, ponds, glaciers > 1 km^{2} (0.386 sq mi or 247 acres) and river estuaries.

Bourg-Saint-Andéol (French pronunciation: [buʁ sɛ̃.t‿ɑ̃deɔl]; Occitan: Bourg-Sant-Andiòu) is a commune in the Ardèche department in the Rhône Valley in southern France.

== Geography ==
It lies directly along the river Rhône at the southeast end of the department 15 km (9.3 mi) south of the smaller town Viviers, 4 km (2.5 mi) from Pierrelatte eastwards across the river in the département Drôme and 10 km (6.2 mi) from Pont-Saint-Esprit, in the north of the département of Gard. 14 km (8.7 mi) to the south-west starts the nearby Ardèche Gorges in Saint-Martin-d'Ardèche.

== History ==
The Gallic settlement on a rocky peak over the Rhône was called Bergoiata. Near the town is a sculpted bas relief of the god Mithras. It acquired its present name after Saint Andeolus, the 'apostle of the Vivarais', a disciple of St. Polycarp, supposedly arriving from Asia Minor, who evangelized the area under Emperor Septimius Severus, and was martyred in 208. The region was named Helvia in Julius Caesar's De Bello Gallico, with Alba-la-Romaine as capital city, then Vivarais from the mediaeval times after the see of Viviers, a region of Languedoc province during Ancien Régime until départements were created at the French Revolution. Due to the citizen's engagement for the Revolution, the town's name rejected a while the little known saint and was named Bourg-sur-Rhône. (At the Napoleonic times, Andéol had already been brought in back...)

It had been the seat of a bailli (royal magistrate). And the bishop of Viviers had settled several decades in Renaissance times in the city (the Bishops' Palace). It is the seat of the mother houses of the Congregation of the Presentation of Mary and of the Religious Congregations of the Presentation.

The city had grown and become one of the most important towns of county Vivarais due to its position on the Rhône (boatmen mariniers du Rhône, trade and business in hide, fabric, wine, oil). Several patricians' houses are still to be seen in the centre of the city (although a part of it was bombed by Allied forces at the end of World War II, missing the hanging bridge - which was replaced afterwards by the existing one).

== Economy ==
Bourg-Saint-Andéol is the shopping center for surrounding villages. In the mid 80es, several factories closed and economy almost drowned (ceramics). Nowadays, Pierrelatte with the site of Tricastin, first atomic energy plant in France, makes that many residents of Bourg-Saint-Andéol earn their livelihood by working over the Rhône. Another noticeable economical source of the area - already a typical mediterranean zone - is wine, with the Côtes du Rhône méridionales (southern) gathering four other communes around the city (Saint-Marcel-d'Ardèche, Saint-Just and Saint-Martin-d'Ardèche). An oil mill has been recently re-established for olive harvests in the area.

== Tourism ==
The area is popular for tourism and summer homes, and the city is known as having the richest cultural heritage in Ardèche: there are many dolmens in the Bois du Laoul forest and a sculpture of Mithra near the Vauclusian springs of the Tourne. Several former noble or grand-bourgeois 18th century places are regularly used for local and visitors during summer season. A mediaeval fort with embellishments dating from the 15th and 17th century, the entire construction a classified historical monument, the Bishops' palace of Bourg-Saint-Andéol with inside the museum René Margotton, front of Rhône, is one of the largest and most complex in the Vivarais region.

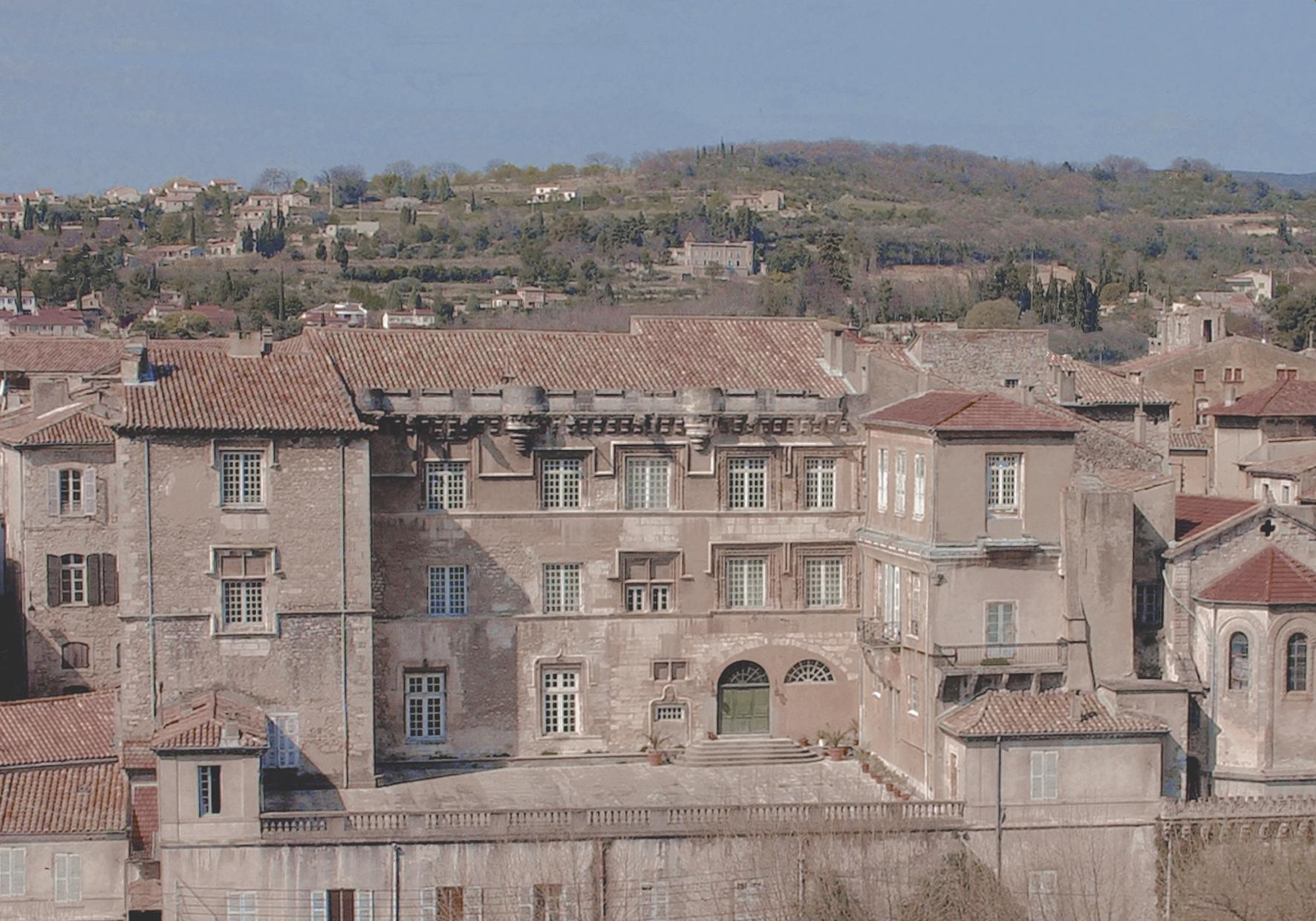
Bishops' Palace

== Population ==
Historical population

Year	Pop.	±% p.a.
1793	3,598	—
1800	3,964	+1.39%
1806	4,100	+0.56%
1821	4,167	+0.11%
1831	4,268	+0.24%
1836	4,290	+0.10%
1841	4,535	+1.12%
1846	4,670	+0.59%
1851	4,857	+0.79%
1856	4,430	−1.82%
1861	4,637	+0.92%
1866	4,515	−0.53%
1872	4,524	+0.03%
1876	4,313	−1.19%
1881	4,308	−0.02%
1886	4,284	−0.11%
1891	4,250	−0.16%
1896	4,264	+0.07%
1901	4,165	−0.47%

Year	Pop.	±% p.a.
1906	4,173	+0.04%
1911	4,195	+0.11%
1921	4,155	−0.10%
1926	4,506	+1.64%
1931	4,203	−1.38%
1936	3,709	−2.47%
1946	3,401	−0.86%
1954	3,668	+0.95%
1962	4,400	+2.30%
1968	7,102	+8.31%
1975	6,861	−0.49%
1982	7,400	+1.09%
1990	7,795	+0.65%
1999	7,768	−0.04%
2007	7,333	−0.72%
2012	7,203	−0.36%
2017	7,116	−0.24%
2023	7,661	+1.24%

Source: EHESS and INSEE (1968-2023)

== Culture ==
- A national institute of clownery art has been settled in Bourg-Saint-Andéol, the Institut National des Arts du Clown.

== Twin cities ==
- Monschau in Germany (Eifel) since 1975
- Albertirsa in Hungary since 1998
- Gaggiano in Italy since 2002

== See also ==
- Communes of the Ardèche department
