= Jean-Antoine Dubois =

French Catholic missionary (1765–1848)

Abbé Jean-Antoine Dubois
- Dodda Swamiyar ("Great Holy Man")
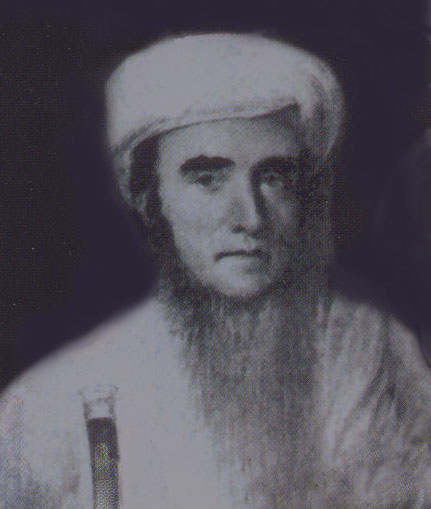
- Lithograph by François-Séraphin Delpech, c. 1820
- Church: Catholic Church
- Province: Missions Étrangères de Paris (MEP)
- In office: 1792–1848
- Other posts: Missionary in India (1792–1823); Director, then Superior of the Missions Étrangères de Paris (1823–1848)

Orders
- Ordination: 1792 by Diocese of Viviers
- Rank: Priest

Personal details
- Born: Jean-Antoine Dubois; January 1765 Saint-Remèze, Languedoc, Kingdom of France (now in Auvergne-Rhône-Alpes, France)
- Died: 17 February 1848 (aged 83) Paris, July Monarchy (now France)
- Occupation: Missionary • Indologist • Author

Abbé J. A. Dubois or Jean-Antoine Dubois (French: [ʒɑ̃ ɑ̃twan dybwa]; January 1765 – 17 February 1848) was a French Catholic missionary in India, and member of the Missions Etrangères de Paris; he was called Dodda Swami by the local people. In his work on Hindu manners, customs and traditions he presented Indian cultures, traditions, thoughts and the varnasrama system. He returned to France, and authored a book of Indology, Hindu Manners, Customs and Ceremonies.

Dubois is remembered in India for having adopted the way of life, clothing, vegetarianism and language typical of a Hindu monk or renunciate, and earning trust and respect. He failed, however, in his mission of converting Indians to Christianity; and often expressed the opinion that the project was doomed to failure.

== Early life ==
Dubois was baptized on 10 January 1766 at Saint-Remèze, in Ardèche, now in south-central France. He was ordained in the diocese of Viviers in 1792, and sent for India that same year, as an MEP missionary.

== Career ==
=== In India ===
In India, Dubois was at first attached to the Pondicherry mission, and worked in the southern districts of the present Madras Presidency. After the fall of Srirangapatna in 1799, he went to Mysore to reorganize the Christian community.

He abjured European society, adopted the native style of clothing, and made himself in habit and costume as much like a Hindu as he could. He used to go around in the garb of sanyasi and abstained from eating meat for many years.

He was credited with the founding of agricultural colonies and the introduction of vaccination as a preventive of smallpox. He also caused a church to be built in Srirangapatna, known in his honour as the "Abbe Dubois Chapel."

He was known as Dodda Swami-avaru in the Mysore region.

Rev. Elijah Hoole of the Wesleyan Mission records meeting Abbe Dubois on Saturday 4 August 1821 at Seringapatam. He describes the Abbe as being dressed in Muslim or Turkish clothes. The Abbe complains about many of his followers being forced to convert to Islam by Tipu Sultan. Having gained proficiency in local languages and customs, the Abbe gained respect among the locals. In his conversation with Elijah, the Abbe expressed the view that India was incapable of accepting Christianity and advised Elijah to return to England at the earliest.

=== Later career ===
Dubois left India in January 1823, with a special pension conferred on him by the East India Company. On reaching Paris, he was appointed director of the Missions Étrangères de Paris, of which he afterwards became superior (1836-1839). He translated into French the Panchatantra, a famous book of Hindu fables, and a work called The Exploits of Guru Paramartha.

== Writings on Indology ==
=== Hindu Manners, Customs and Ceremonies ===
His most notable work was Hindu manners, customs and ceremonies. Although Dubois disclaimed the title of author, his collections were not so much drawn from the Hindu sacred books as from his own careful and vivid observations, and it is this, united to a remarkable prescience, that makes his work so valuable. The book contains three parts:

- a general view of society in India, and especially of the caste system
- the four states of Brahminical life
- religious practices — festivals, feasts, temples, objects of worship

Lord William Bentinck purchased Dubois's French manuscript for eight thousand rupees for the British East India Company in 1807. In 1816 an English translation was published, and about 1864, a curtailed reprint of this edition was issued. The Abbé, however, largely recast his work as Mœurs, institutions et cérémonies des peuples de l'Inde (published in Paris in 1825), and in 1897 this revised text (now in the India Office) was published in an edition with notes by H. K. Beauchamp.

Sylvie Murr has claimed that Dubois' Hindu Manners, Customs and Ceremonies derived from Gaston-Laurent Coeurdoux's original manuscript, Mœurs et coutumes des Indiens, now lost.

=== Other writings ===
Of much interest was his Letters on the State of Christianity in India, published in London in 1823, in which he asserted his opinion that under existing circumstances, there was no possibility of "overcoming the invincible barrier of Brahminical prejudice" so as to convert the Hindus to any sect of Christianity. He acknowledged that low castes and outcastes might convert in large numbers, but of the higher castes, he wrote:

"Should the intercourse between individuals of both nations, by becoming more intimate and more friendly, produce a change in the religion and usages of the country, it will not be to turn Christians that they will forsake their own religion, but rather ... to become mere atheists."

== Abbe Dubois Chapel, Srirangapatna ==
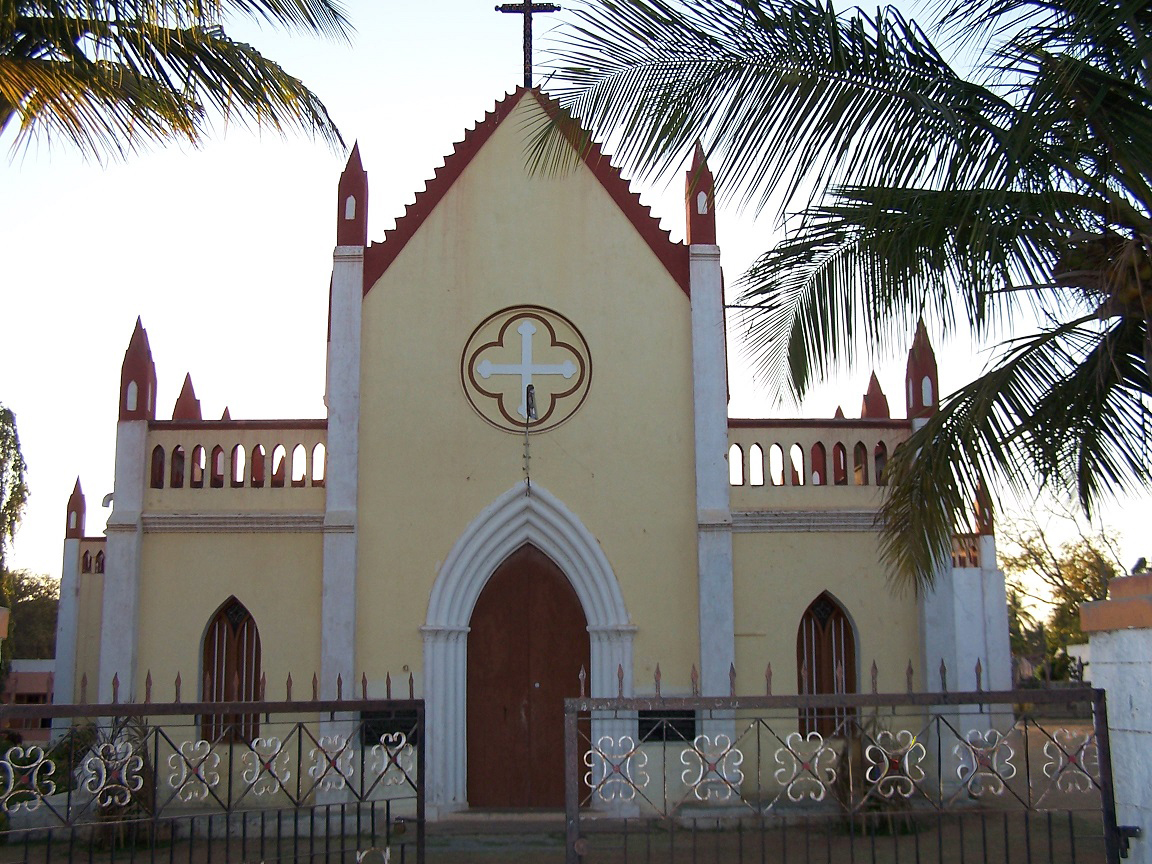
Abbe Dubois Chapel, Srirangapatna

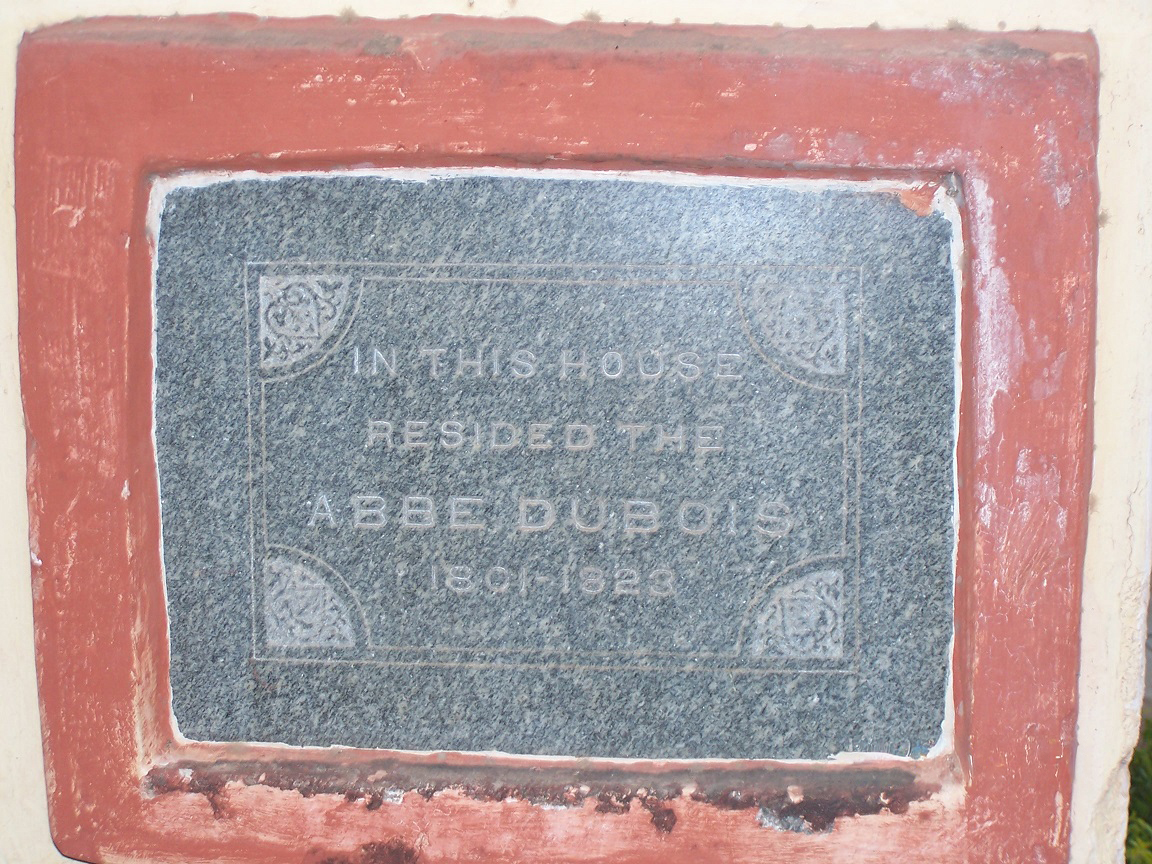
Memorial Plaque

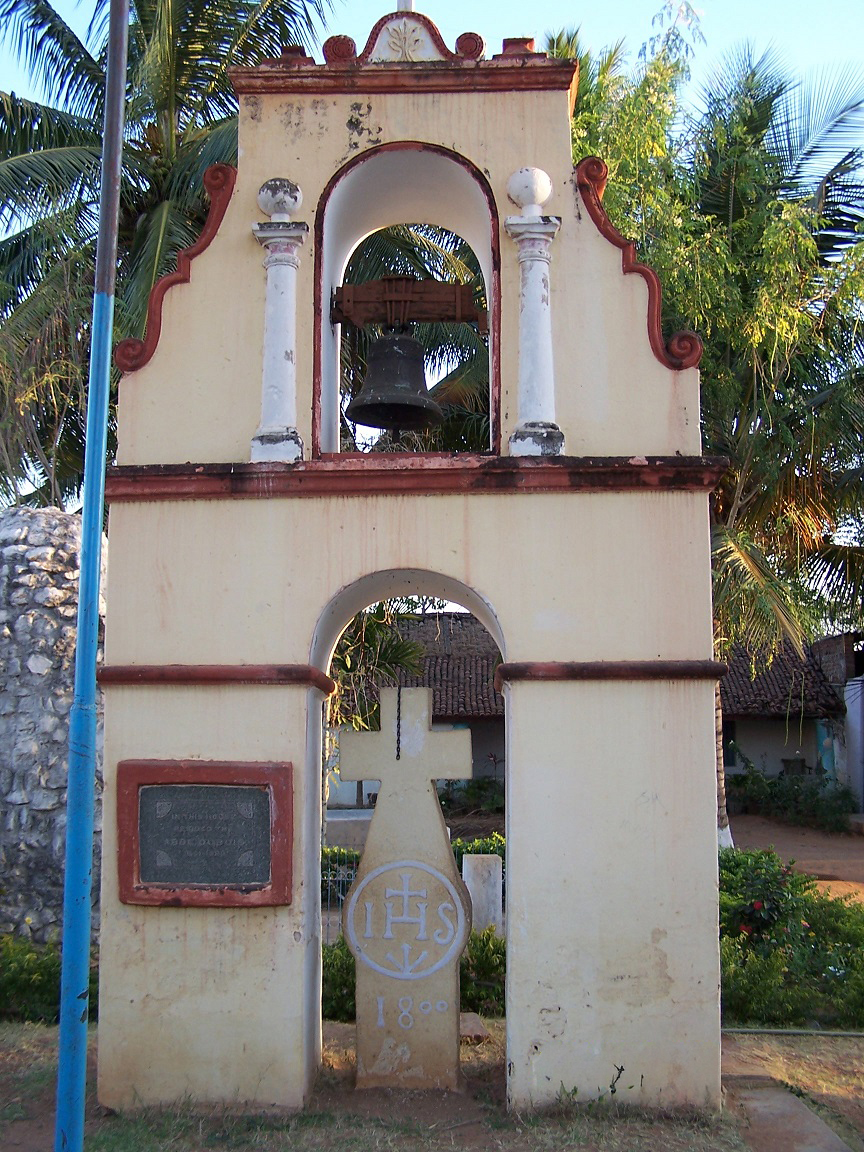
Bell Tower

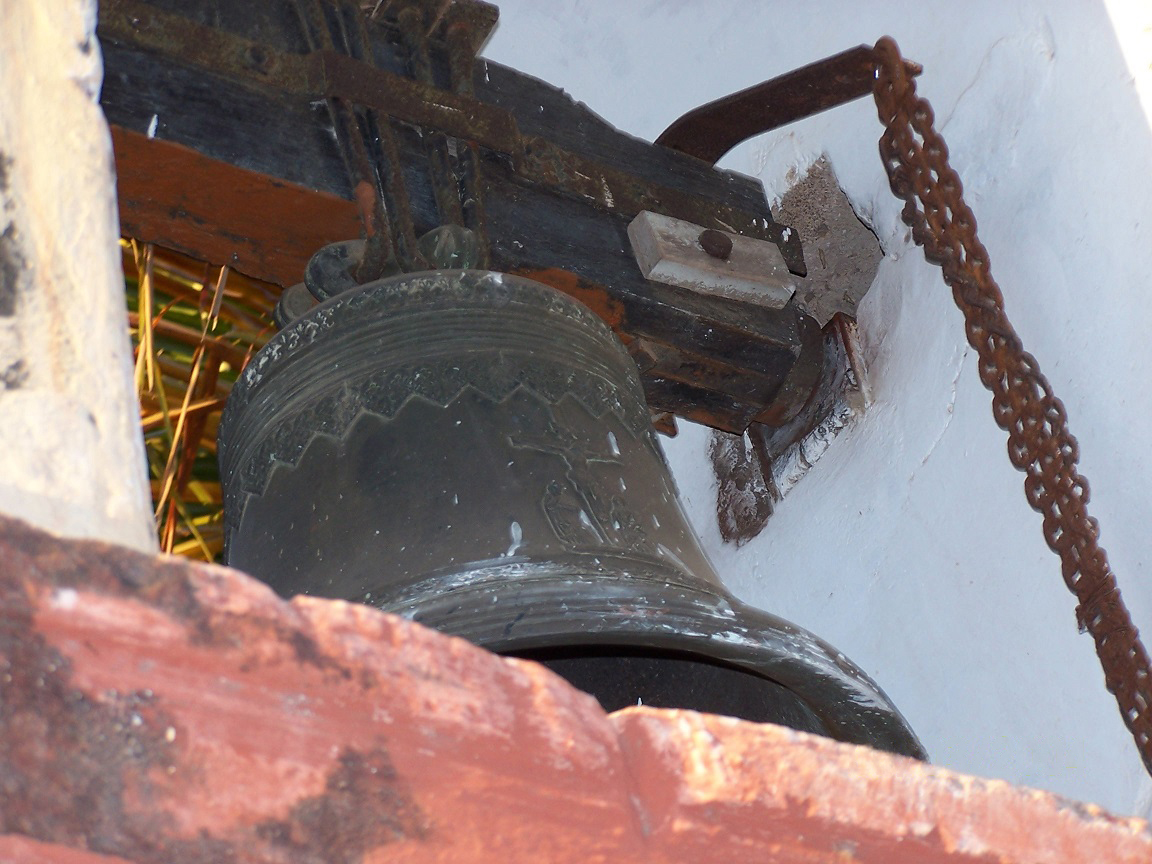
Church Bell
