= Antoine Bara Blaisot =

- Born: 1794; Paris
- Died: 1876 (aged 81–82)
- Other name: Antoine Barru Blaisot

Antoine Bara Blaisot (1794, Paris - 1876), also known as Antoine Barru Blaisot, was a French engraver, publisher of lithographs and gallery owner. He is known to have operated a gallery selling engravings at 6 rue de Grammont, Paris.

== Publishing ==
Blaisot frequently commissioned artists to created engravings for his Galerie Universelle series, published from 1822 through 1828.

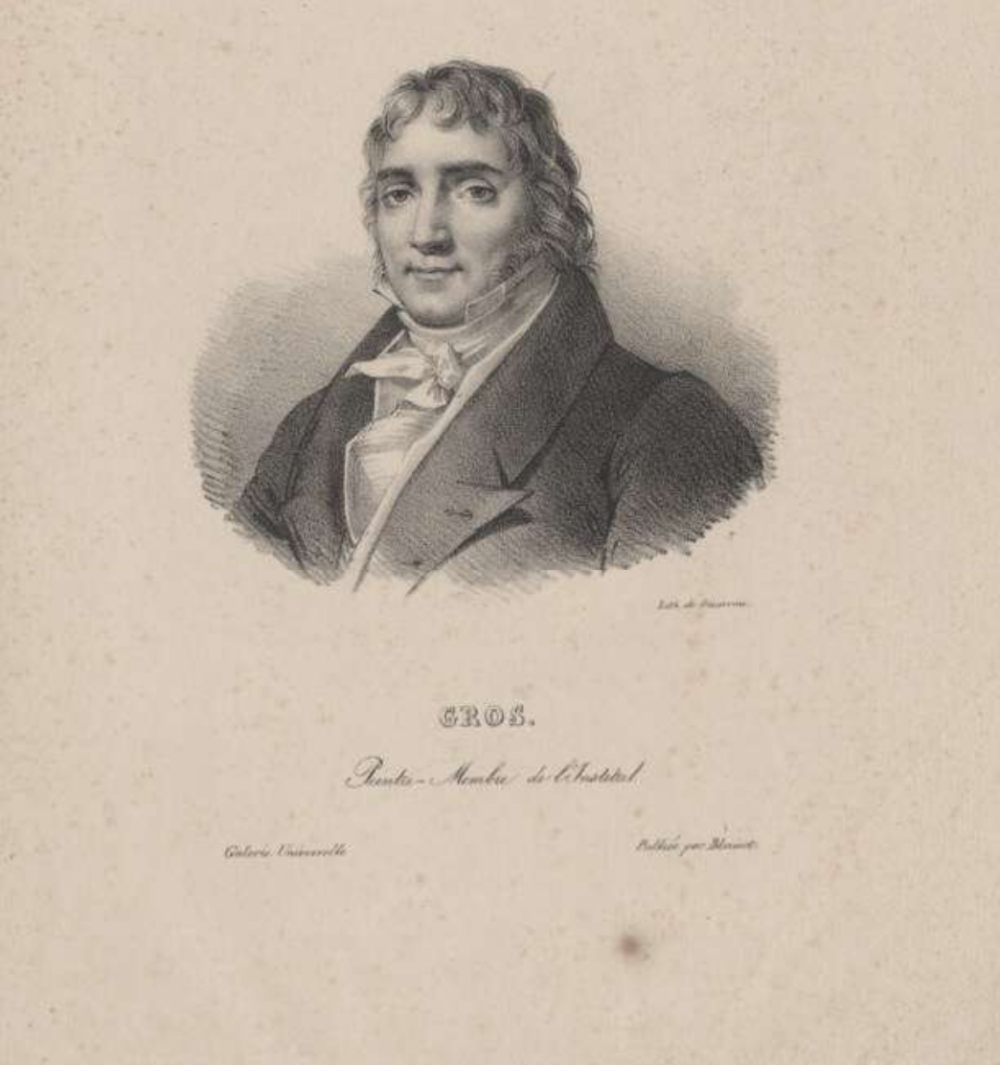
French painter Antoine-Jean Gros in a lithograph published under Blaisot's Galerie Universel.

Lithographs from the Galerie Universelle series are held in the National Library of Portugal, the National Maritime Museum, Greenwich, the Musée Carnavalet, Paris, the British Museum, the Dallas Museum of Art and the Rijksmuseum, Amsterdam.

In 1836, with Charles Gosselin, he co-published Pétrarque by Alphonse Rastoul.

From 1862 to 1864 he edited Luigi Ceroni's engravings of enamel caricatures created by Jean Petitot.

Blaisot was the editor and publisher of the Petit Atlas National des 86 départements de la France et de ses colonies., published in 1833.

== The Competition ==
Throughout the 1820s, Godefroy Engelmann and François-Séraphin Delpech proved to be Blaisot's main competitors.

Engelmann's influence stemmed largely from the fact that after formally learning the art of lithography in Germany, he thereafter travelled to Paris and founded a printing press in 1816.

Apart from this, Delpech resoundingly stood out to be the most popular Parisian publisher of fine art prints of the era. In today's terms, he would be considered to have been the Go To Guy for producing prints which could depict noble personages or provide immediate coverage concerning significant events. Presumably, he was well established, whereby he operated his business from 23 Quai Voltaire for more than a decade; thereby overlooking the Seine River near to the Louvre.

In this regard, a table is presented below which enables viewers to compare prints of Marie Antoinette which were circulated by all three publishers:

IMAGES OF MARIE ANTOINETTE
ENGELMANN; Published 1822	DELPECH; Published 18?	BLAISOT; Published 1827
View corresponding image of Marie-Antoinette	View corresponding image of Marie-Antoinette	View corresponding image of Marie-Antoinette

As for Alois Senefelder, the inventor of the lithography, another comparison is made with respect to Lord Byron, evidently clothed in the same attire.

IMAGES OF LORD BYRON
SENEFELDER; Published 1826	BLAISOT; Published 1826
View corresponding image of Lord Byron	View corresponding image of Lord Byron

As it pertains to the prints identified above, Blaisot's notability becomes quite apparent, whereby he:

- Moved from a religious rendition of Marie-Antoinette to one which exhibits a more secular disposition
- Moved from a somewhat noble or ethereal rendition of Lord Byron to one which assumes more the appearance of an everyday citizen

Such types of alterations appealed to an upcoming clientele of masses who thereafter found themselves finally able to afford fine art prints as they began to circulate in large quantities in and about Paris. The reason for a greater acceptance was quite obvious; being that such depictions, for the most part, actually bore a closer resemblance to themselves.
