= François-Joachim de Pierre de Bernis =

Catholic cardinal (1715–1794)

His Eminence François-Joachim de Pierre de Bernis
- Cardinal, Archbishop of Albi
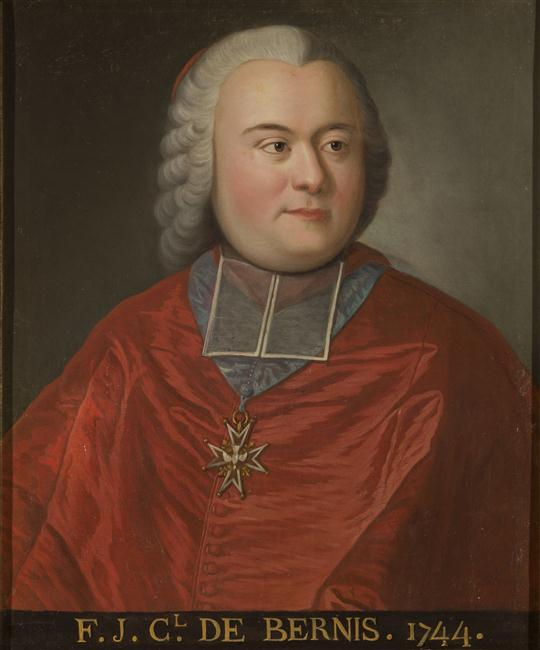
- Church: Roman Catholic Church
- Archdiocese: Albi
- See: Cathedral Basilica of Saint Cecilia
- Installed: 9 July 1764
- Term ended: 3 November 1794
- Predecessor: Léopold-Charles de Choiseul-Stainville
- Successor: François de Pierre de Bernis
- Other post: French Ambassador to Rome

Personal details
- Born: 22 May 1715 Saint-Marcel d'Ardèche, France
- Died: 3 November 1794 (aged 79) Rome, Papal States
- Education: Lycée Louis-le-Grand
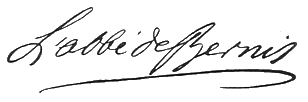
- Signature

François-Joachim de Pierre de Bernis, comte de Lyonnais (22 May 1715 – 3 November 1794) was a French cardinal and diplomat. He was the sixth member elected to occupy Seat 3 of the Académie française in 1744. Bernis was a prominent figure in the autobiography of Giacomo Casanova, Histoire de ma vie (Story of My Life), starting from the chapter on "Convent Affairs".

== Early life and career ==
Born at Saint-Marcel d'Ardèche, de Bernis was of a noble, but impoverished family, and, being a younger son, was intended for the church. His father, Joachim de Pierre, seigneur de Bernis, was a captain of cavalry and, in 1697, was married to Marie Elisabeth, daughter of Nicolas de Chastel de Condres. The cardinal's elder brother was Philippe Charles François (1714–1774), baron de Pierrebourg, marquis de Pierre de Bernis, seigneur de Saint-Marcel. François was educated at the Louis-le-Grand college and the seminary of Saint-Sulpice, Paris, but did not take holy orders until 1755.

Bernis became known as one of the most expert epigrammatists in the joyous society of Louis XV's court, and by his verses won the friendship of Madame de Pompadour, the royal mistress, who obtained for him an apartment, furnished at her expense, in the Tuileries, and a yearly pension of 1500 livres. Voltaire admired his verses, calling him Babet la bouquetière. In 1744, he was elected to seat 3 of the Académie française.

In 1752, Bernis was appointed to the French embassy at Venice, where he acted, to the satisfaction of both parties, as mediator between the republic and Pope Benedict XIV. During his stay in Venice he received subdeacon's orders, and on his return to France in 1755 was made a papal councillor of state.

Bernis took an important part in the delicate negotiations between France and Austria which preceded the Seven Years' War. He regarded the alliance purely as a temporary expedient, and did not propose to employ the whole forces of France in a general war. But he was overruled by his colleagues. Bernis became secretary for foreign affairs on 27 June 1757, but owing to his attempts to counteract the spendthrift policy of the marquise de Pompadour and her followers, he fell into disgrace and was, in December 1758, banished to Soissons by Louis XV, where he remained in retirement for six years. In the previous November he had been created cardinal by Pope Clement XIII.

== In Roma ==
On the death of the royal mistress in 1764, Bernis was recalled and once more offered the seals of office, but declined them, and was appointed archbishop of Albi. His occupancy of the see was not of long duration. In 1769, he went to Rome to assist at the conclave which resulted in the election of Pope Clement XIV, and the talent which he displayed on that occasion procured him the appointment of ambassador to Rome, where he spent the remainder of his life. He was partly instrumental in bringing about the suppression of the Jesuits, and acted with greater moderation than is generally allowed. He assisted the wavering pope in securing the delays for which he had asked. But the pressure exercised by the Bourbons of Spain, Naples, and France, and the passive attitude and tacit consent of Austria brought the negotiations to an abrupt termination. During the French Revolution, he celebrated, in the national church of San Luigi dei Francesi in Rome, a solemn funeral for Louis XVI, who had been executed on the guillotine in 1793. He resigned the administration of his archdiocese rather than take the constitutional oath.

Bernis lost his influence under Pope Pius VI, who was friendly to the Jesuits, to whom he was hostile. He was reduced almost to penury but the court of Spain, mindful of the support he had given to their ambassador in obtaining the condemnation of the Jesuits, came to his relief with a handsome pension. He devoted himself to the French exiles, placing his palace at the disposal of the princesses of France who had sought refuge in Rome, for Pius bestowed on him posthumously the epithet "Protector of the Church of France".

Bernis died at Rome on 3 November 1794, and was buried in the church of S. Luigi de Francesi. In 1803 his remains were transferred to the cathedral at Nîmes. His poems, the longest of which is La Religion vengée (Parma, 1794), were collected and published after his death (Paris, 1797, etc.). His Mémoires et lettres 1715-58 (8 vols. Paris. 1878) are still interesting to the historian.

== See also ==
- Comte de Lyon
- Papal conclave, 1769
- Papal conclave, 1774-1775

== Notes ==
Attribution:
