= Andeolus =

Alleged Christian missionary

Saint Andeolus
- Coat of Arms of Saint-Andéol-de-Clerguemort, showing St. Andeolus

Martyr
- Born: Smyrna (modern-day İzmir, Turkey)
- Died: 208; Bergoiata, Viviers, Gaul (modern-day France)
- Venerated in: Eastern Orthodox Church, Roman Catholic Church
- Canonized: Pre-congregation
- Major shrine: Church of Bourg-Saint-Andéol, France
- Feast: May 1 or May 4 (Gregorian calendar)
- Attributes: deacon, holding a book and palm of martyrdom, head pierced by a wooden knife

Andeolus or Andéol is an alleged Christian missionary martyred in Gaul.

== Narrative ==
Andeolus was reportedly born in Smyrna in the 2nd century. A deacon, he was sent by Polycarp, along with Benignus, to evangelize southern Gaul. According to The Passio of Saint Benignus, they were shipwrecked on Corsica but managed to make their way to Marseilles. From there they travelled up the Rhone River and the Saône, reaching Autun, they converted Symphorianus, son of the noble Faustus. Symphorianus was later martyred for his faith as Saint Symphorian. Andeolus then went to the Vivarais.

Septimius Severus, passing through that region, had him put to death. He was executed on May 1, 208, at Bergoiata, a Gallic settlement on a rocky peak over the Rhône River which would be later known as Bourg-Saint-Andéol. The body, thrown into the Rhone, was later found and placed in a sarcophagus by a rich Roman woman, Anycia or Amycia Eucheria Tullia (Blessed Tullie), daughter of senator Eucherius Valerianus (Eucherius of Lyon).

A sarcophagus, purported to be that of Andeolus, was rediscovered in 1865 during excavations in the St. Polycarp chapel of the eleventh-century church in Bourg-Saint-Andéol (Ardèche).

== Analysis ==
Johann Peter Kirsch says that while it is a historical fact that Benignus suffered martyrdom in a persecution of the third century and was publicly honored as a martyr, early in the sixth century no particulars concerning the person and life of Benignus were known at Dijon.

Louis Duchesne has shown that these accounts are part of a group of legends which arose in the early years of the sixth century and were intended to demonstrate the early the beginnings of Christianity in the cities of that region such as Besançon, Autun, Langres and Valence. "They are historically unreliable, and the very existence of some of the martyrs connected with these places is doubtful." Kirsch says, "They are all falsifications by the same hand and possess no historical value."
