= Canton of Bourg-Saint-Andéol =

Coordinates: 44.37°N 4.64°E

- Canton
- Situation of the canton of Bourg-Saint-Andéol in the department of Ardèche
- Country: France
- Region: Auvergne-Rhône-Alpes
- Department: Ardèche
- No. of communes: {{{nbcomm}}}
- Population (2023): 19,302
- INSEE code: 0705

The canton of Bourg-Saint-Andéol is an administrative division of the Ardèche department, southern France. Its borders were modified at the French canton reorganisation which came into effect in March 2015. Its seat is in Bourg-Saint-Andéol.

It consists of the following communes:

1. Bidon
2. Bourg-Saint-Andéol
3. Gras
4. Larnas
5. Saint-Just-d'Ardèche
6. Saint-Marcel-d'Ardèche
7. Saint-Martin-d'Ardèche
8. Saint-Montan
9. Viviers
