= Count of Lyon =

In France of the Ancien Régime, the title of Count of Lyon was purely honorific. There had been a count of Lugdunensis, a military governor, in the early 5th-century Roman Notitia dignitatum, and among the Merovingians an Armentarius was count of Lugdunensis during the tenure of Nicetius, Bishop of Lyon (552–573). In a document of 818, a Bermond is noted as count of Lugdunensis, a non-hereditary appointment made by Charlemagne. But the title as inheritable was attached to the Count of Forez in a document of ca 1097, confirming the founding of a hospital at Montbrison, and it fell from use with Count Guy IV in the early 13th century.

The title "Count of Lyon" was not subsequently attached to a seigneurie nor was it hereditary but was carried by the Dean and each of the canons of the cathedral of Lyon. The cathedral chapter of Lyon was among the most eminent of France and claimed to have been founded by "John, king of Burgundy" [sic] who filled it with lords of the noblest houses. The canons in public proclamations, "most noble counts of Lyon", had to prove that they were nobles de quatre races, on both the paternal and maternal side, in other words that all their great-grandparents had been noble, the notorious seize quartiers or "sixteen quarterings" of a coat-of-arms.

The canons enjoyed some extraordinary privileges: they officiated at mass with the mitre of a bishop on their heads, whether priest or deacon or sub-deacon. A transcription made in 1672, of an old document records that "none, with the exception of the counts, may put his coat-of-arms on the altar during celebration of masses for the dead". Their extraordinary pretension drew a censure from the Sorbonne, 18 April 1555, condemning the refusal of the canon-counts to genuflect at the elevation of the Host; the dispute, in which the Dean and the canon-counts were opposed, had to be taken to the Cardinal of Lorraine and the Cardinal de Tournon for adjudication, where they were reminded that even the kings of France bent the knee at this occasion; however, the canons obtained an order in council on 23 August 1555 maintaining them in this privilege, which they renounced voluntarily in the reign of Louis XIV for fear of the king's displeasure.

François-Joachim de Pierre, Cardinal de Bernis, who owed his preferment to Madame de Pompadour, was taxed by her, when they eventually broke: "I raised you out of the mud". The Cardinal, who had arrived in Paris very young, with only 1500 livres in income, but agreeable in face and manners, and a count of Lyon, replied justly: "un comte de Lyon ne peut pas être tiré de la boue"— "a count of Lyon cannot be raised from the mud".
