= Zofia Czeska =

Polish religious sister

Blessed Zofia Czeska-Maciejowska
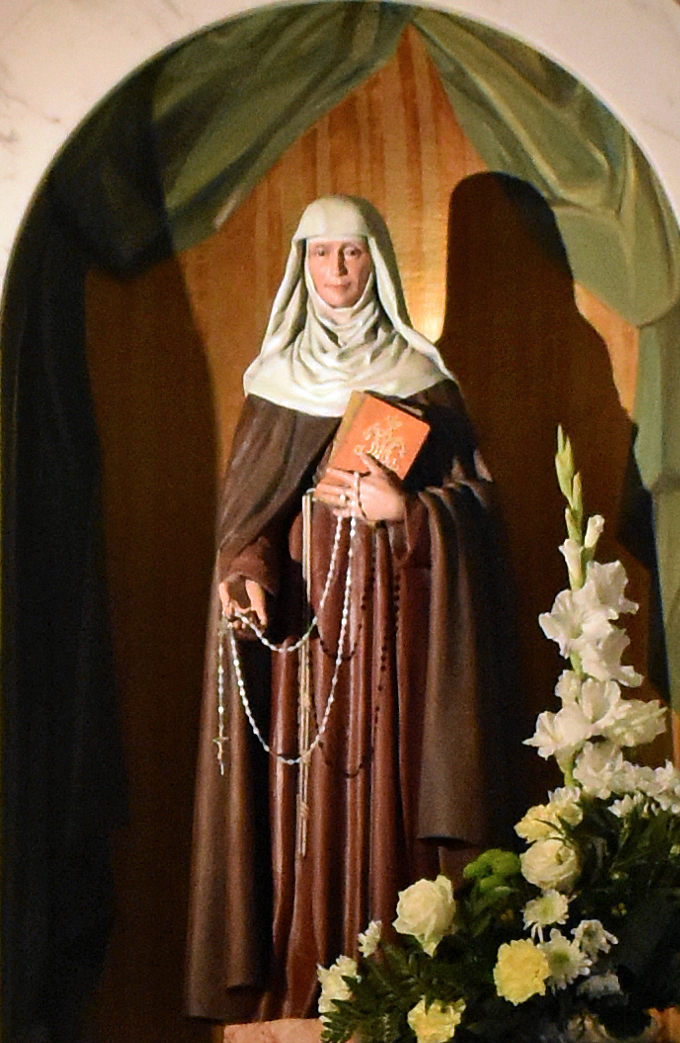
- Statue of Zofia Czeska at the Church of St. John the Baptist and St. John the Evangelist in Kraków, where she is buried in its chapel
- Born: 1584; Budziszowice, Kazimierski, Polish–Lithuanian Commonwealth
- Died: 1 April 1650 (aged 66); Kraków, Polish–Lithuanian Commonwealth
- Venerated in: Roman Catholic Church
- Beatified: 9 June 2013, Kraków, Poland by Cardinal Angelo Amato
- Feast: 1 April

Zofia Czeska-Maciejowska (1584 – 1 April 1650) was a Polish religious sister and the founder of the Sisters of the Presentation of the Blessed Virgin Mary. Czeska was widowed prior to her call into the religious life. Her beatification was celebrated on 9 June 2013.

== Life ==
Zofia Czeska-Maciejowska was born in the Polish–Lithuanian Commonwealth in 1584 as one of nine children to Mateusz Maciejowska and Katarzyna Lubowiecka; one sister younger than her was Anna.

Czeska married in 1600 to Jan Czeska and was widowed in 1626 childless at which point her religious calling flourished. During her marriage she had belonged to the Archconfraternity of Mercy at the Jesuit Church of St. Barbara in Kraków.

Czeska organised a school for girls in Kraków from 1621 until 1627 (at 18 Szpitalna Street) and then decided to found a women's religious institute that she titled the Sisters of the Presentation which she set up on 31 May 1627. Thus the institution that she had introduced was dedicated to the care and the education of poor and orphaned girls which she threw herself into with much apostolic vigor. In 1602 she joined a religious movement that the Jesuit priest Piotr Skarga founded. One day she returned home after Mass, and a man kidnapped her, demanding the two be married; she refused and the man eventually married her little sister Anna.

She opened her home in Krakow to local girls and founded a school named the ‘Maiden's House of the Presentation of the Blessed Virgin Mary’ - this was the first formally organised girls' school in Poland.

She founded the Sisters of the Presentation of the Blessed Virgin Mary on 13 January 1660. The congregation was officially recognised a few months after her death.

Czeska died on 1 April 1650 and her remains were interred in the basilica of St. Mary's Church in Krakow.

Her order continues to operate in both her native Poland and in Ukraine. In 2008 there were 126 religious in 18 houses and the order was aggregated to the Order of Friars Minor on 19 April 1938. As of 2022, the order had 98 sisters in 15 houses in Poland. The order works in schools, colleges, kindergartens and orphanages.

== Beatification ==
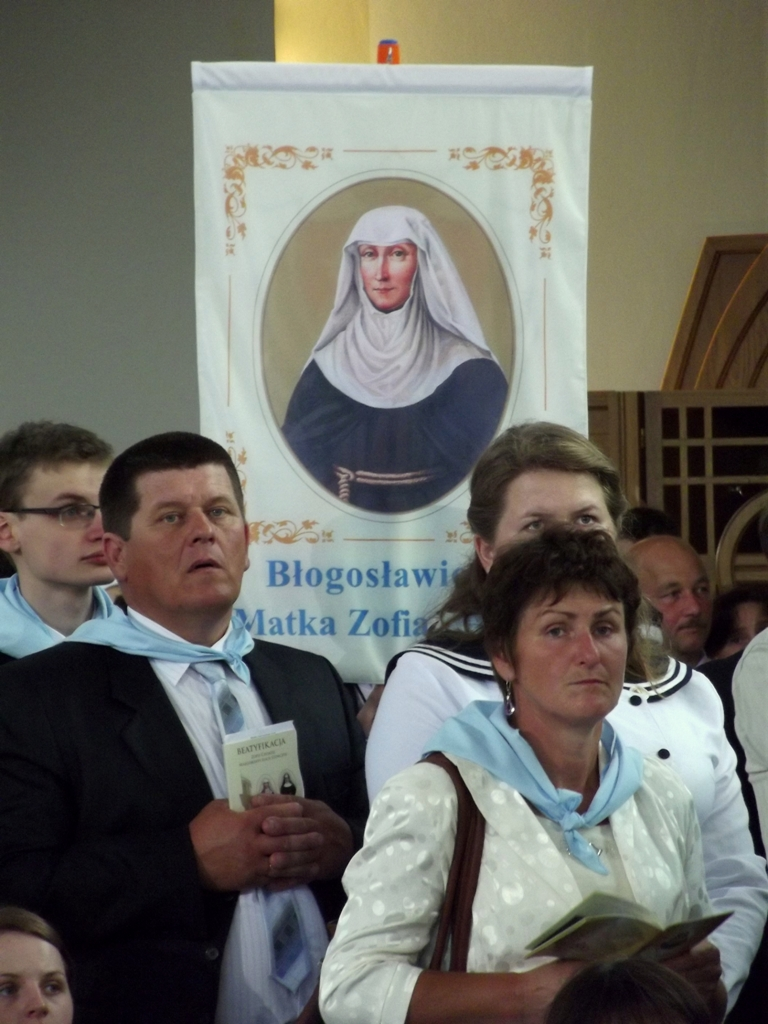
An image of Zofia during the beatification ceremony in 2013

The beatification process opened in a diocesan process in Kraków on 1 April 1995. It was concluded its business on 20 November 1997; during the process the formal assent to the cause was granted under Pope John Paul II on 2 June 1995 and granted the use of the title of Servant of God after the official "nihil obstat" was granted. The process was validated on 30 March 1998 and the Positio was sent to the Congregation for the Causes of Saints in Rome in 2005 for assessment. Historians approved the cause on 14 March 2006 as did the theologians on 25 February 2011 and the C.C.S. on 7 June 2011.

On 27 June 2011 she was proclaimed to be Venerable after Pope Benedict XVI found that she had lived a life of heroic virtue. The miracle for her beatification was investigated from 5 September 2003 until 9 January 2004; it was validated later on 4 July 2008. A medical board approved it on 31 May 2012 as did theologians on 6 October 2012 and the C.C.S. on 10 December 2012. Benedict XVI signed a decree that recognized a miracle attributed to her on 20 December 2012. Cardinal Angelo Amato - on the behalf of Pope Francis - celebrated the beatification on 9 June 2013 in Kraków. The postulator for this cause is Sr. Maria Renata Gąsior.

== See also ==
Religious Congregations of the Presentation
