= Saint-Montan =

Saint-Montan Sant Montan (Occitan)
- Commune
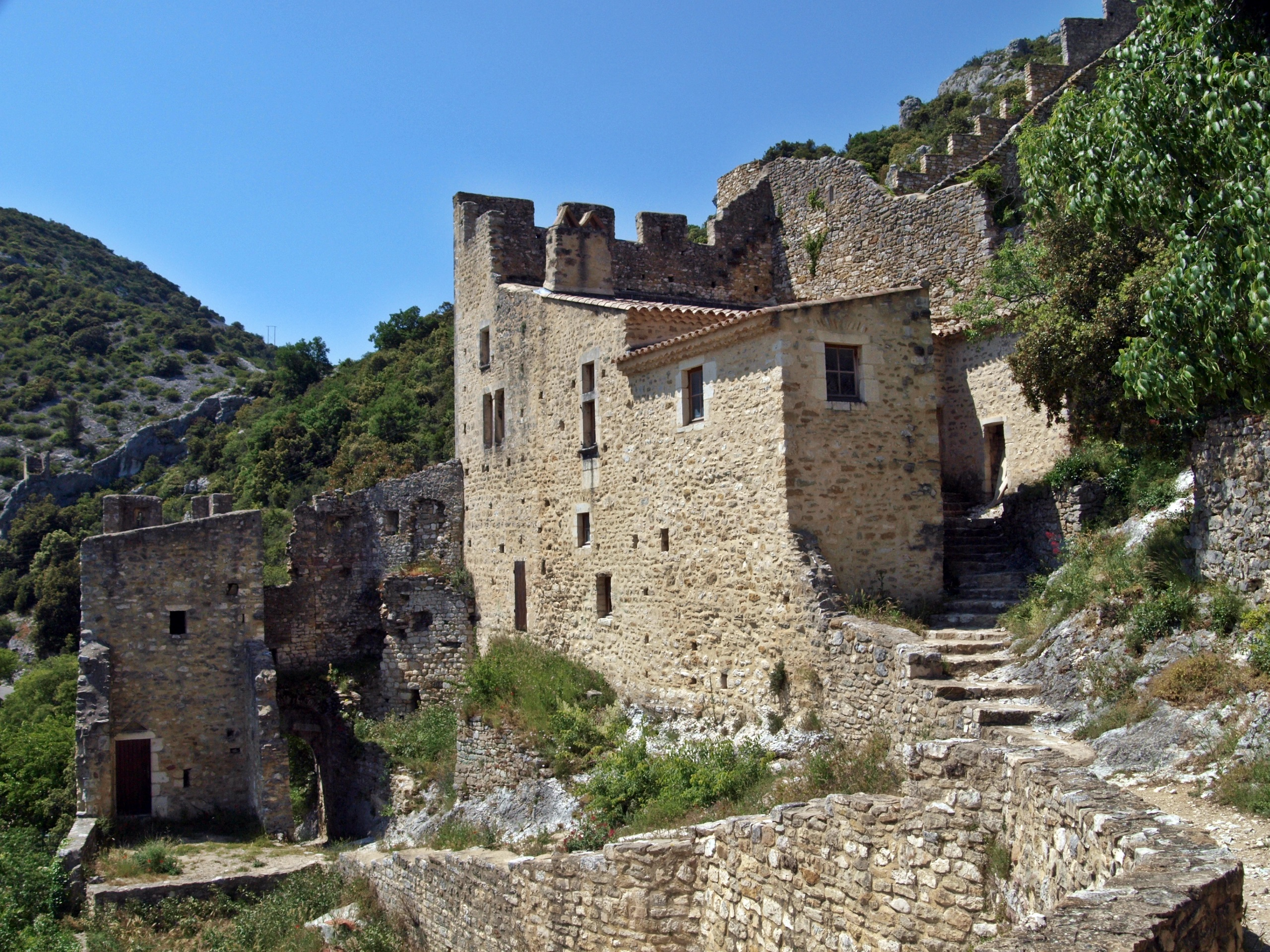
- Château de Saint-Montan

- Coat of arms
- Location of Saint-Montan
- Location within France Location within Auvergne-Rhône-Alpes
- Coordinates: 44°26′26″N 4°37′33″E
- Country: France
- Region: Auvergne-Rhône-Alpes
- Department: Ardèche
- Arrondissement: Privas
- Canton: Bourg-Saint-Andéol

Government
  - Mayor (2020–2026): Christophe Mathon
- Area^{1}: 33.18 km^{2} (12.81 sq mi)
- Elevation: 62 m (203 ft)
- Highest elevation: 400 m (1,300 ft)
- Lowest elevation: 56 m (184 ft)
- Population (2023): 1,978
  - Density: 59.61/km^{2} (154.4/sq mi)
- Time zone: UTC+01:00 (CET)
  - Summer (DST): UTC+02:00 (CEST)
- INSEE/Postal code: 07279 /07220
- ^{1} French Land Register data, which excludes lakes, ponds, glaciers > 1 km^{2} (0.386 sq mi or 247 acres) and river estuaries.

Saint-Montan (French pronunciation: [sɛ̃ mɔ̃tɑ̃]; Occitan: Sant Montan, before 2002: Saint-Montant) is a commune in the Ardèche department in the Auvergne-Rhône-Alpes region in Southern France. It is located on the departmental border with Drôme, which follows the course of the Rhône.

== Demographics ==
Historical population
Year	Pop.	±% p.a.
1968	727	—
1975	822	+1.77%
1982	1,009	+2.97%
1990	1,207	+2.26%
1999	1,314	+0.95%
2007	1,718	+3.41%
2012	1,837	+1.35%
2017	1,897	+0.64%
2023	1,978	+0.70%
Source: INSEE

== See also ==
- Côtes du Vivarais AOC
- Communes of the Ardèche department
