= Gras, Ardèche =

Gras
- Commune
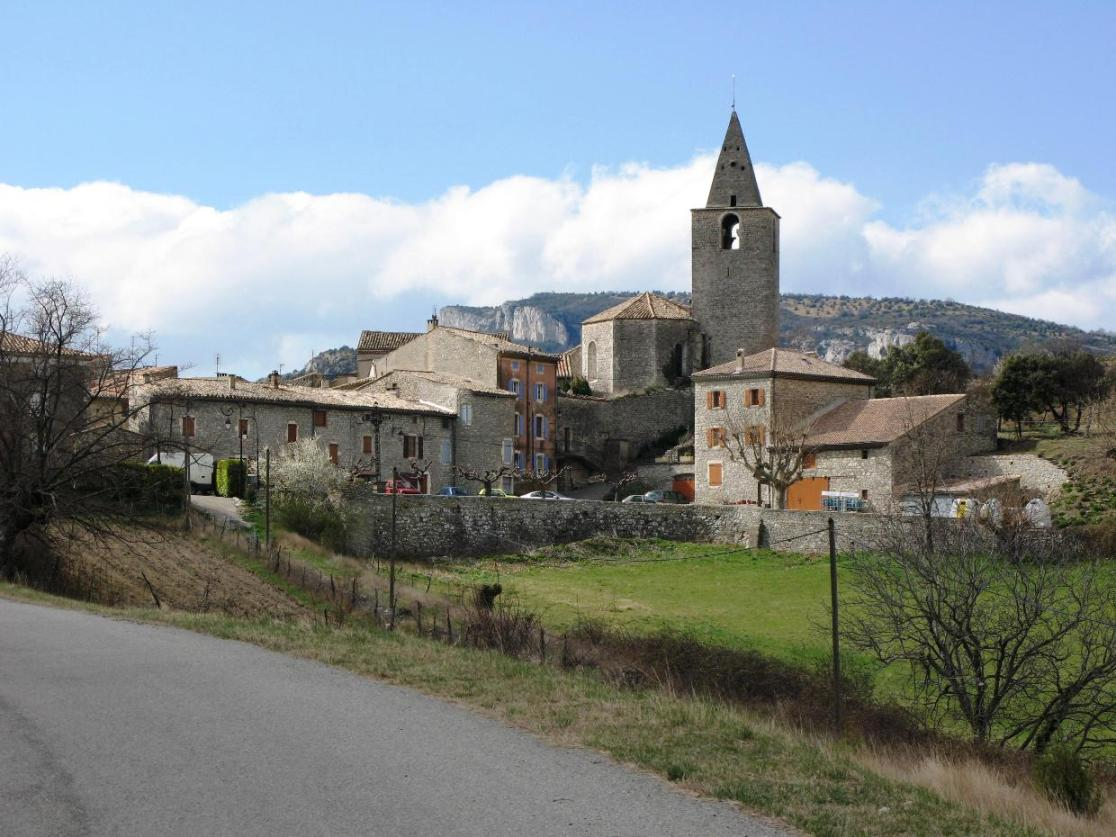
- The church and surroundings in Gras
- Location of Gras
- Location within France Location within Auvergne-Rhône-Alpes
- Coordinates: 44°26′39″N 4°32′26″E
- Country: France
- Region: Auvergne-Rhône-Alpes
- Department: Ardèche
- Arrondissement: Privas
- Canton: Bourg-Saint-Andéol

Government
  - Mayor (2023–2026): Olivier Chautard
- Area^{1}: 56.68 km^{2} (21.88 sq mi)
- Elevation: 345 m (1,132 ft)
- Highest elevation: 732 m (2,402 ft)
- Lowest elevation: 120 m (390 ft)
- Population (2023): 591
  - Density: 10.4/km^{2} (27.0/sq mi)
- Time zone: UTC+01:00 (CET)
  - Summer (DST): UTC+02:00 (CEST)
- INSEE/Postal code: 07099 /07700
- ^{1} French Land Register data, which excludes lakes, ponds, glaciers > 1 km^{2} (0.386 sq mi or 247 acres) and river estuaries.

Gras (French pronunciation: [ɡʁa]; Occitan: Graàs) is a commune in the Ardèche department in southern France.

== Population ==
Historical population
Year	Pop.	±% p.a.
1968	260	—
1975	234	−1.49%
1982	250	+0.95%
1990	317	+3.01%
1999	381	+2.06%
2007	494	+3.30%
2012	600	+3.96%
2017	635	+1.14%
2023	591	−1.19%
Source: INSEE

== See also ==
- Côtes du Vivarais AOC
- Communes of the Ardèche department
