= Côtes du Vivarais AOC =

- Wine region
- Official name: Côtes de Vivarais AOC
- Type: AOC
- Year established: VDQS 1962; AOC 1999
- Years of wine industry: 2,000
- Country: France
- Part of: Rhône Valley
- Other regions in Rhône Valley: Côtes du Rhône, Costières de Nîmes
- Climate region: Mediterranean with cool mountain winds
- Soil conditions: limestone marl
- Size of planted vineyards: 554
- No. of vineyards: 138
- Grapes produced: Grenache noir, Syrah, Carignan, Cinsault, Grenache blanc, Clairette, Marsanne
- No. of wineries: 33
- Wine produced: red, white, rosé
- Comments: 2005

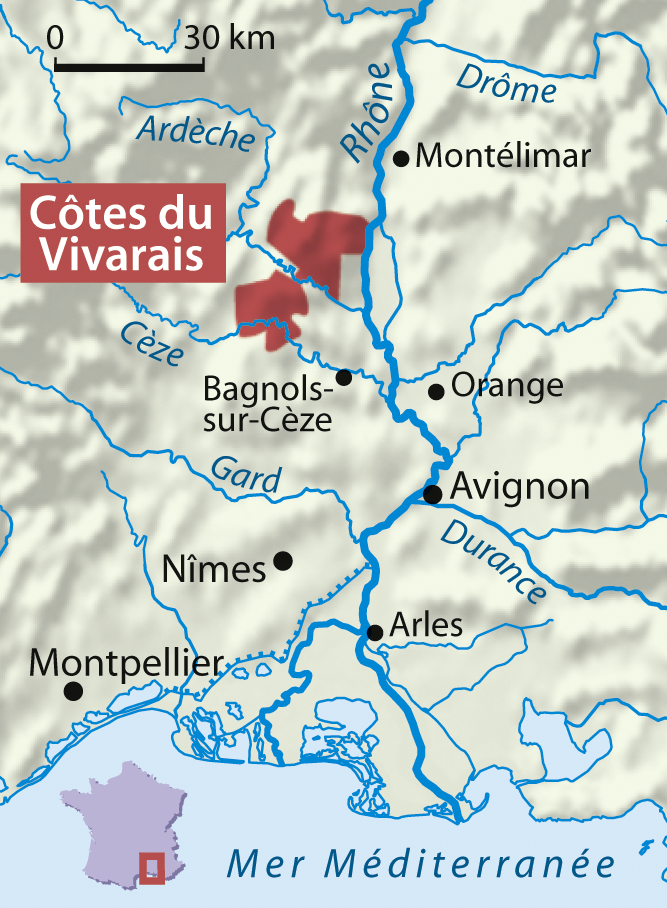
Location of Côtes du Vivarais

Côtes du Vivarais (French pronunciation: [kot dy vivaʁɛ]) is a wine-growing AOC in the northwestern extreme of the southern Rhône wine region of France. The wines are produced in 9 communes of the Ardèche department, and in 5 communes of the department of the Gard. The region is bisected by the deep Gorges of the Ardèche and is shares the same latitudes as the Coteaux de Tricastin AOC on the left bank of the Rhône. The wine became a VDQS in 1962 and was awarded the Appellation d'Origine Contrôlée in 1999.

== Wines ==
Red wines account for 80% of the production and are made from Grenache noir minimum 30%, and Syrah, minimum 40% with carignan at less than 10% (until the harvest of 2017), and Cinsault at less than 10% (from the harvest of 2018) as secondary varieties.

Rosé wines account for 15% of the production and are made from Grenache noir, Syrah and Cinsault at .

White wines comprise 5% of the production and are made from Clairette blanche, Grenache blanc, Marsanne.

== Economy ==
Wines have been produced in the region for over 2,000 years. In the region extending from the Rhône valley to the Cévennes and the Ardèche mountains - both foothills of the Massif Central - vines were cultivated by the Helvians, an ancient Gallic tribe. Pliny the Elder reported about a vine in Helvie “that flowers in a day, which protects it from accidents”; the region would wait however, until the Middle Ages before the production was well established and the wine became well known. With the planting of the traditional Rhône valley varieties of Grenache noir, Syrah, Grenache blanc and Marsanne in the early second half of the 20th century, cooperative wineries were formed to increase production to a commercial scale. The Côtes du Vivarais wines are produced on a total of 554 hectares by 149 concerns which include 138 growers, 22 small private wineries, and the 11 cooperative wineries which cater for about 90% of the production.

The vineyards are at an altitude of 250 metres on either side of the gorge and are located in the Ardèche communes of Bidon, Gras, Labastide-de-Virac, Lagorce, Larnas, Orgnac-l'Aven, Saint-Montan, Saint-Remèze, and Vinezac, and in the Gard communes of Barjac, Le Garn, Issirac, Montclus, and Saint-Privat-de-Champclos.

== See also ==
- French wine
