= Religious Congregations of the Presentation =

Congregation of the Presentation may refer to several Roman Catholic female religious congregations. They independently took their names from the Presentation of Mary at the Temple in Jerusalem, as her parents consecrated their young girl to God.

== Sisters of the Presentation of the Blessed Virgin Mary (PBVM) ==
The Presentation Sisters, officially the Sisters of the Presentation of the Blessed Virgin Mary, are a religious institute founded in Cork, Ireland, by Honora "Nano" Nagle in 1775. Historically, the sisters focused their energies on creating and staffing schools that would educate young people, especially young women. As of 2024, over 1,400 Presentation Sisters are active in 19 countries. The Sisters' example inspired the formation of the Presentation Brothers (FPM) by Ireland's Edmund Ignatius Rice in 1802.

== Sisters of the Presentation of the Blessed Virgin Mary (SSF) ==
Unrelated to the Irish-rooted PBVM, another congregation named Sisters of the Presentation of the Blessed Virgin Mary was founded in 1837 by Henriette DeLille for African-American women in New Orleans. In 1842, this congregation renamed itself the Sisters of the Holy Family (French: Soeurs de la Sainte Famille). They have also served in Panama, Belize, and Nigeria, and numbered 83 sisters as of 2017.

== Daughters of the Presentation (France, 1627–c.1800) ==
The Daughters of the Presentation were a French congregation, founded in 1627 by Nicolas Sanguin (1580–1653), Bishop of Senlis. He turned his attention to the foundation of a teaching order to combat the prevailing ignorance and the resulting vice in the diocese. Two young women from Paris, Catherine Dreux and Marie de la Croix, began the work of teaching in 1626 and the following year were formed into a religious community, which shortly afterwards was enclosed under the Rule of St. Augustine.

The opposition of the municipal authorities gave way before the Bull of erection granted by Pope Urban VIII (4 January 1628) and letters patent of Louis XIII granted in 1630, the year in which the first solemn profession was held. In 1632, papal permission was obtained for two of Bishop Sanguin's sisters and a companion to leave their Moncel monastery of the Order of St. Clare, to form the new community in the religious life. Seven years later, they were received as members into the new order, over which they presided for more than thirty years. The congregation did not survive the French Revolution, although under Bonaparte one of the former members organized at Senlis a school which was later taken over by the municipality. The habit was black serge over a robe of white serge, with a white guimpe, a black bandeau, and veil. The Catholic Encyclopedia speculates that the original constitutions were altered by Sanguin's nephew and successor as Bishop of Senlis, owing to the frequent reference made in them to the devotion of Slavery to Our Lady, which was suppressed by the Catholic Church.

== Daughters of the Presentation of Mary in the Temple (DPMT) ==
The Daughters of the Presentation of Mary in the Temple were founded in 1833 by Francesca Butti and Maria Rossi in Como, Italy. This congregation has been active primarily in India.

== Franciscan Sisters of the Presentation of the Blessed Virgin Mary (FSPM) ==
The Franciscan Sisters of the Presentation of the Blessed Virgin Mary were founded in India in 1853 by the French missionary Joseph Louis Ravel. Also active in Europe and Africa, the congregation reported 822 sisters as of 2016.

== Sisters of the Presentation of the Blessed Virgin (OP) ==
The Dominican Sisters of the Presentation of the Blessed Virgin were founded in 1696 by Marie Poussepin at Sainville in the Diocese of Chartres, for teaching and the care of the sick. At the time of the religious disturbances in France, over 1,700 sisters were engaged in France, Spain, South America, and Asiatic Turkey, where they had charge of a number of schools and protectories for girls. At Agua de Dios in Colombia, they cared for a colony of lepers. In 1813, the mother-house was established at Saint-Symphorien near Tours. In 1897, the congregation affiliated with the Order of Preachers (Dominicans), as Poussepin had always wanted. The sisters were recently serving in 36 countries on four continents.

== Sisters of Mary of the Presentation (SMP) ==
The Vincentian Sisters of Mary of the Presentation were founded in Broons, France, in 1828. They have served in France, Belgium, the Netherlands, the United Kingdom, the United States, Canada, and Cameroon, specializing in education and health care.

== Sisters of the Presentation of Mary (PM) ==
The Sisters of the Presentation of Mary were founded in 1796 by Anne-Marie Rivier in Ardèche, France. As of 2024, the sisters report 850 members ministering in 19 countries in Europe, Africa, Asia, North and South America.

== Sisters of the Presentation of Our Lady (OLVP) ==
The Sisters of the Presentation of Our Lady (Dutch: Onze Lieve Vrouw Presentatie) were founded near Ghent in 1830 by Mary Augustine Weewauters, for the education of girls. The mother-house was at Saint-Nicolas until 2014 as membership dwindled.

== Little Sisters of the Presentation of Our Lady (PSP) ==
The Little Sisters of the Presentation of Our Lady in the Temple (French: Petites Soeurs de la Presentation de Notre Dame au Temple) have been active in the Democratic Republic of Congo, Uganda and Italy. The congregation was founded in 1948 by Henri Piérard, bishop of Beni, DRC.

== Virgins of the Presentation of the Blessed Virgin Mary (Poland) ==
The congregation of the Virgins of the Presentation of the Blessed Virgin Mary (Latin: Congregatio Virginum a Praesentatione Beatae Mariae Virginis) was founded by Zofia Czeska in 1627 in Kraków, with an emphasis on educating girls. As of 2022, the order had 98 sisters in 15 houses in Poland.
