= Larnas =

- Commune
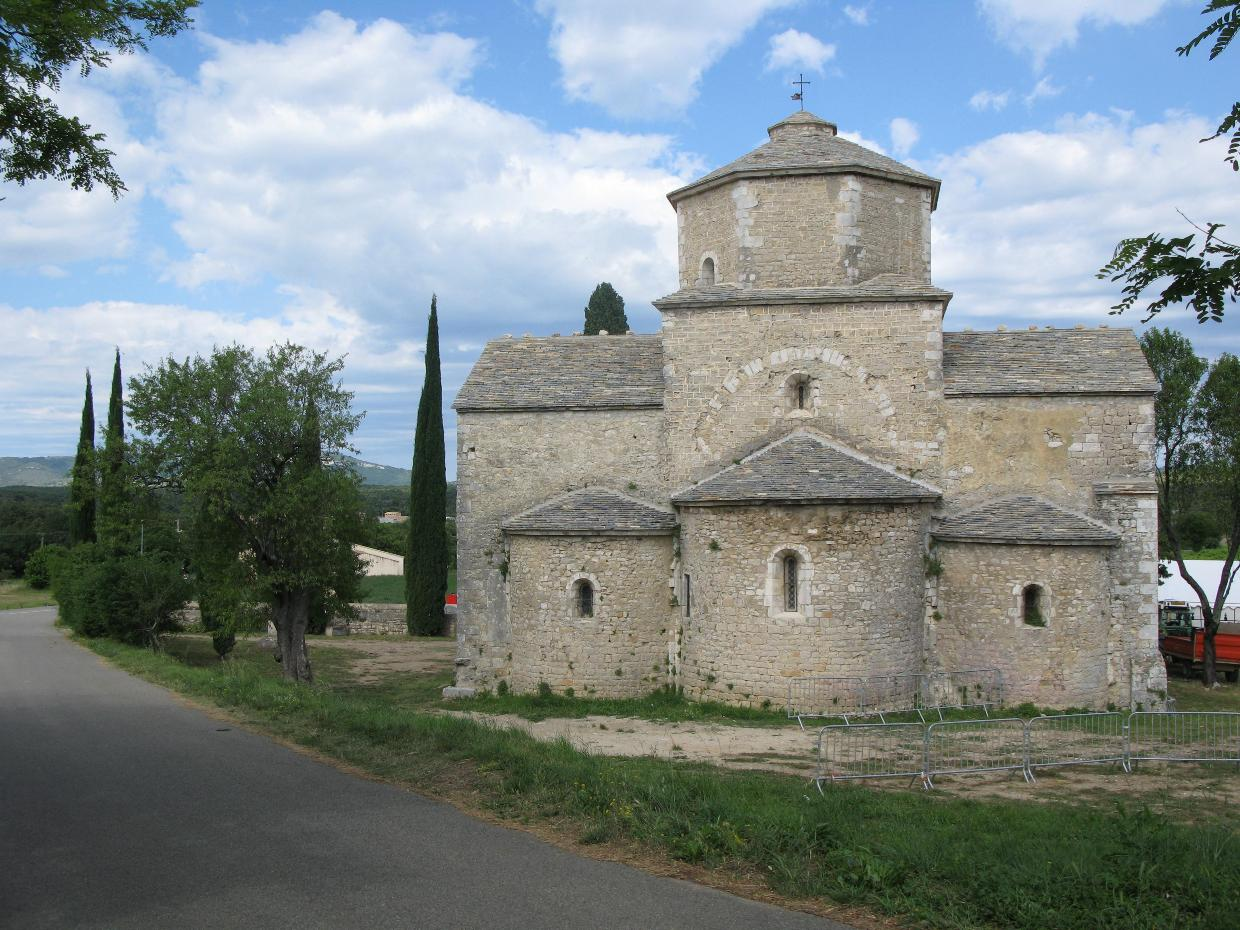
- The church in Larnas

- Coat of arms
- Location of Larnas
- Location within France Location within Auvergne-Rhône-Alpes
- Coordinates: 44°26′57″N 4°36′00″E
- Country: France
- Region: Auvergne-Rhône-Alpes
- Department: Ardèche
- Arrondissement: Privas
- Canton: Bourg-Saint-Andéol

Government
  - Mayor (2020–2026): Bernard Chazaut
- Area^{1}: 13.5 km^{2} (5.2 sq mi)
- Elevation: 250 m (820 ft)
- Highest elevation: 364 m (1,194 ft)
- Lowest elevation: 120 m (390 ft)
- Population (2023): 283
  - Density: 21.0/km^{2} (54.3/sq mi)
- Time zone: UTC+01:00 (CET)
  - Summer (DST): UTC+02:00 (CEST)
- INSEE/Postal code: 07133 /07220
- ^{1} French Land Register data, which excludes lakes, ponds, glaciers > 1 km^{2} (0.386 sq mi or 247 acres) and river estuaries.

Larnas is a commune in the Ardèche department in southern France.

== Population ==
Historical population
Year	Pop.	±% p.a.
1968	52	—
1975	56	+1.06%
1982	83	+5.78%
1990	70	−2.11%
1999	90	+2.83%
2007	91	+0.14%
2012	195	+16.47%
2017	238	+4.07%
2023	283	+2.93%
Source: INSEE

== See also ==
- Côtes du Vivarais AOC
- Communes of the Ardèche department
