= Bidon, Ardèche =

Bidon
- Commune
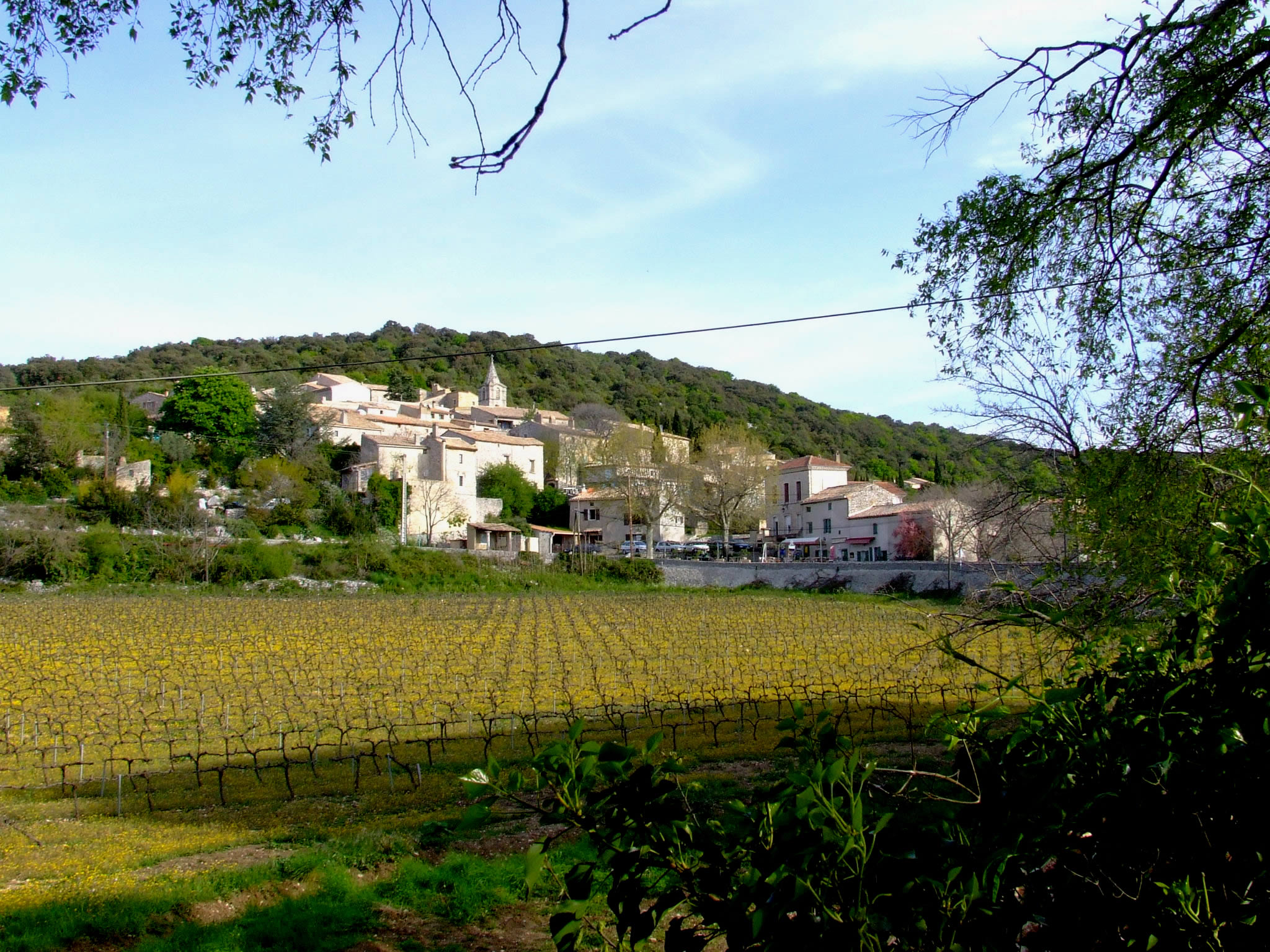
- A general view of Bidon
- Location of Bidon
- Location within France Location within Auvergne-Rhône-Alpes
- Coordinates: 44°22′01″N 4°32′10″E
- Country: France
- Region: Auvergne-Rhône-Alpes
- Department: Ardèche
- Arrondissement: Privas
- Canton: Bourg-Saint-Andéol
- Intercommunality: Rhône aux gorges de l'Ardèche

Government
  - Mayor (2020–2026): Brigitte Dumarché
- Area^{1}: 28.93 km^{2} (11.17 sq mi)
- Elevation: 285 m (935 ft)
- Highest elevation: 402 m (1,319 ft)
- Lowest elevation: 48 m (157 ft)
- Population (2023): 254
  - Density: 8.78/km^{2} (22.7/sq mi)
- Time zone: UTC+01:00 (CET)
  - Summer (DST): UTC+02:00 (CEST)
- INSEE/Postal code: 07034 /07700
- ^{1} French Land Register data, which excludes lakes, ponds, glaciers > 1 km^{2} (0.386 sq mi or 247 acres) and river estuaries.

Bidon (French pronunciation: [bidɔ̃]; Occitan: Bidon) is a commune in the Ardèche department in southern France.

== Population ==
Historical population
Year	Pop.	±% p.a.
1968	29	—
1975	32	+1.42%
1982	59	+9.13%
1990	69	+1.98%
1999	112	+5.53%
2007	141	+2.92%
2012	232	+10.47%
2017	241	+0.76%
2023	254	+0.88%
Source: INSEE

== See also ==
- Côtes du Vivarais AOC
- Communes of the Ardèche department
