= Vivarais =

Former French province

Vivarais (French pronunciation: [vivaʁɛ]; Occitan: Vivarés; Latin: Vivariensis provincia) is a traditional region in the south-east of France, covering the département of Ardèche, named after its capital Viviers on the river Rhône. In feudal times part of the Holy Roman Empire with its bishop as count, it became in 1309 one of the Capetian territories as included in the Languedoc province of the French realm, and continued to be a French province until 1789.

In 1999, a wine region, Côtes du Vivarais AOC, was established near Côtes du Rhône in several communes of the south of département Ardèche and a few in northern Gard.
