= Saint-Just-d'Ardèche =

- Commune
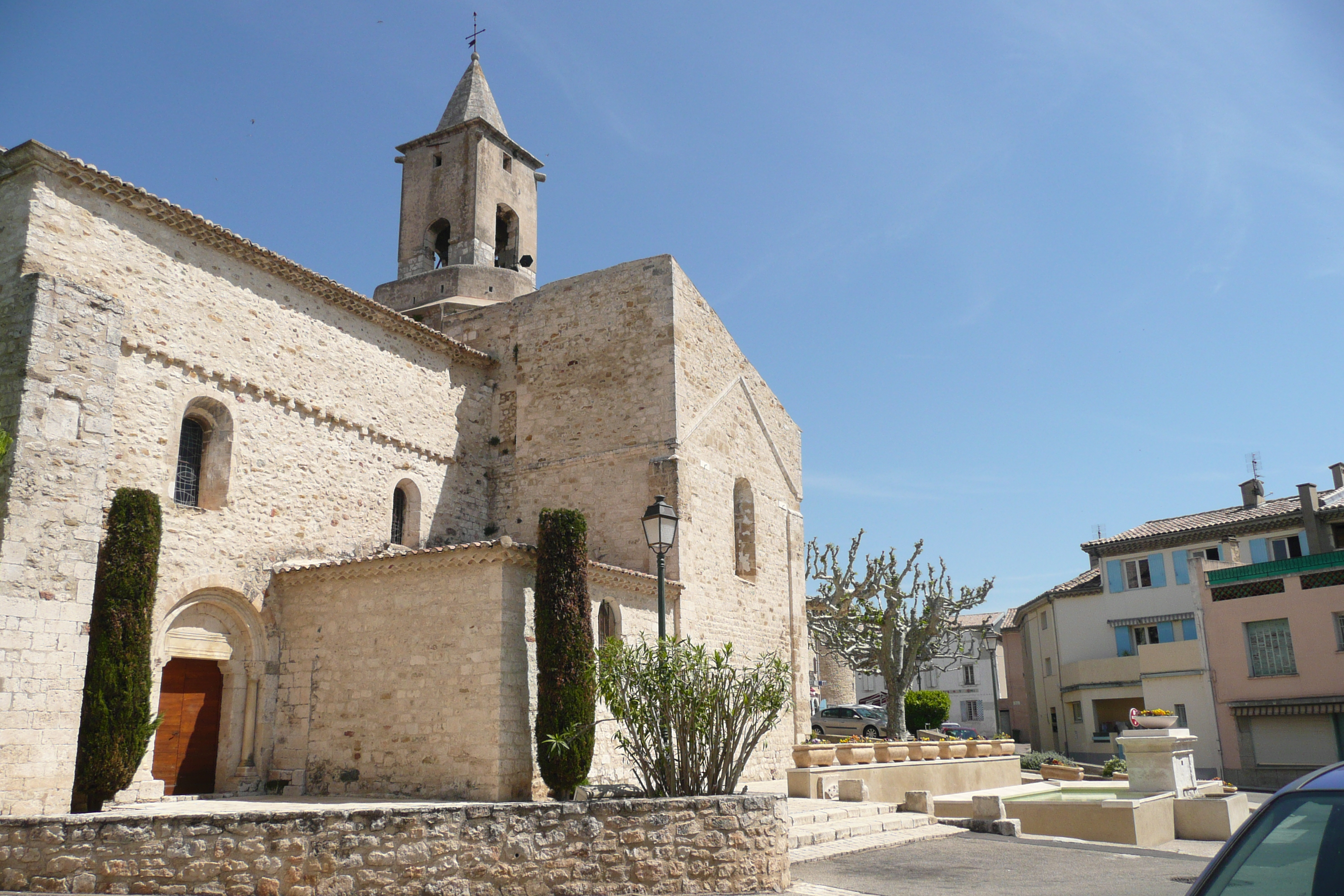
- The church in Saint-Just-d'Ardèche

- Coat of arms
- Location of Saint-Just-d'Ardèche
- Location within France Location within Auvergne-Rhône-Alpes
- Coordinates: 44°18′19″N 4°36′42″E
- Country: France
- Region: Auvergne-Rhône-Alpes
- Department: Ardèche
- Arrondissement: Privas
- Canton: Bourg-Saint-Andéol

Government
  - Mayor (2020–2026): Brigitte Pujuguet
- Area^{1}: 10.44 km^{2} (4.03 sq mi)
- Elevation: 63 m (207 ft)
- Highest elevation: 115 m (377 ft)
- Lowest elevation: 38 m (125 ft)
- Population (2023): 1,577
  - Density: 151.1/km^{2} (391.2/sq mi)
- Time zone: UTC+01:00 (CET)
  - Summer (DST): UTC+02:00 (CEST)
- INSEE/Postal code: 07259 /07700
- ^{1} French Land Register data, which excludes lakes, ponds, glaciers > 1 km^{2} (0.386 sq mi or 247 acres) and river estuaries.

Saint-Just-d'Ardèche (before 2011: Saint-Just, Occitan: Sant Just) is a commune in the Ardèche department in southern France.

== Geography ==
Saint-Just-d'Ardèche is the southernmost village of the department, located on the shore of the Rhône River, between the Drôme and the Gard departments.

== Population ==
Historical population
Year	Pop.	±% p.a.
1968	833	—
1975	770	−1.12%
1982	1,009	+3.94%
1990	1,078	+0.83%
1999	1,161	+0.83%
2007	1,469	+2.98%
2012	1,677	+2.68%
2017	1,684	+0.08%
2023	1,577	−1.09%
Source: INSEE

== Transportation ==
Saint-Just is located along the Route nationale 86.

== See also ==
- Communes of the Ardèche department
