= François-Séraphin Delpech =

French artist

François-Séraphin Delpech (1778 – 25 April 1825) was a French artist and lithographer.

Delpech served as an art critic for the Mercure de France during the period of the First French Empire. In 1818, he opened a printmaking studio in Paris. From 1819 onward, Delpech produced lithographic portraits of a number of leading figures of his time. Today, Delpech's works are held in the Bibliothèque nationale de France; the National Portrait Gallery, London; the Fine Arts Museums of San Francisco; and the Musée de la Révolution française.

== Selected works ==
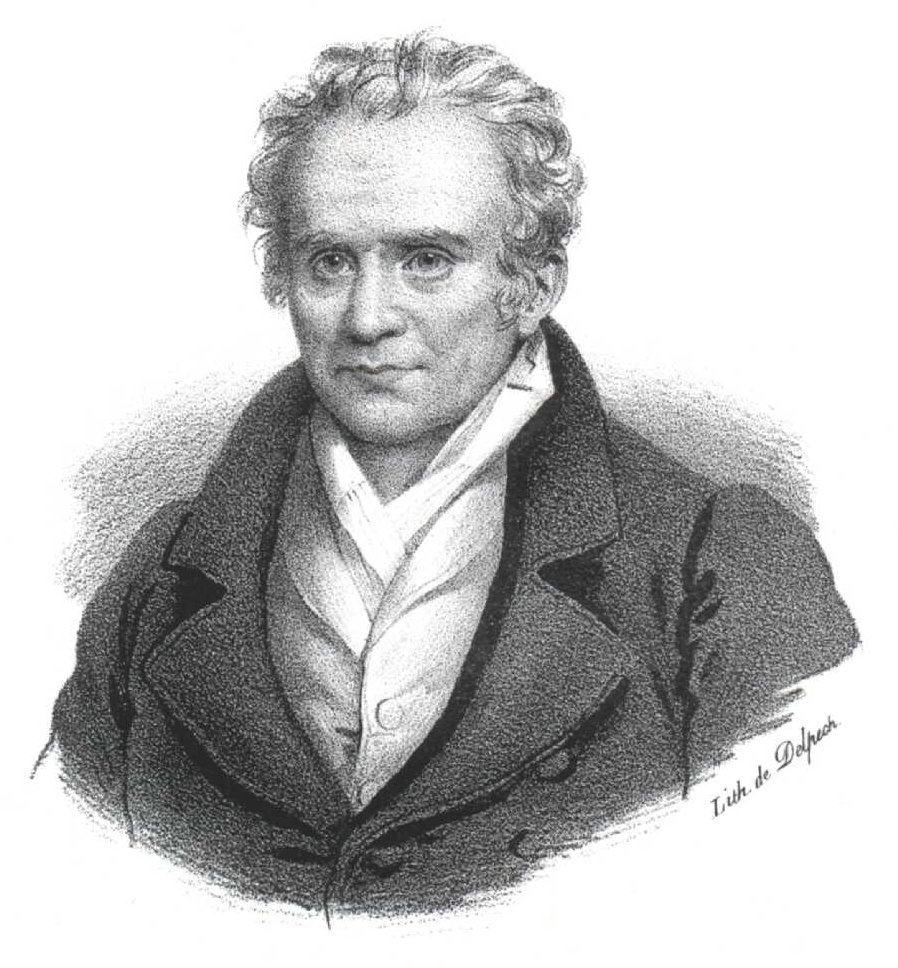
Portrait of Gaspard Monge, French mathematician

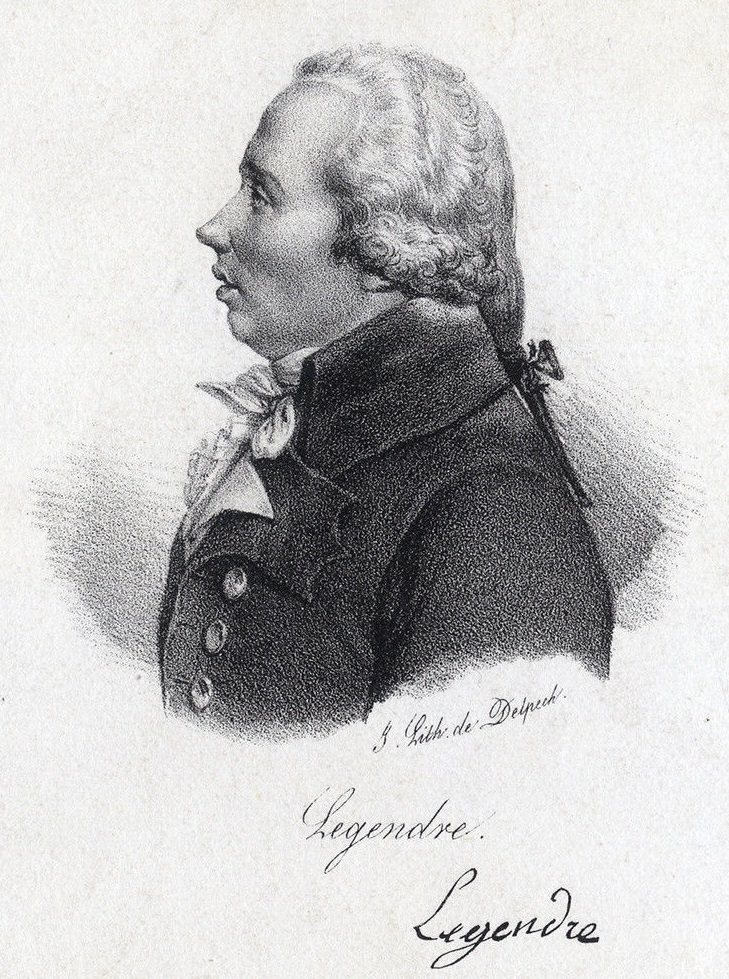
Portrait of Louis Legendre, French revolutionary

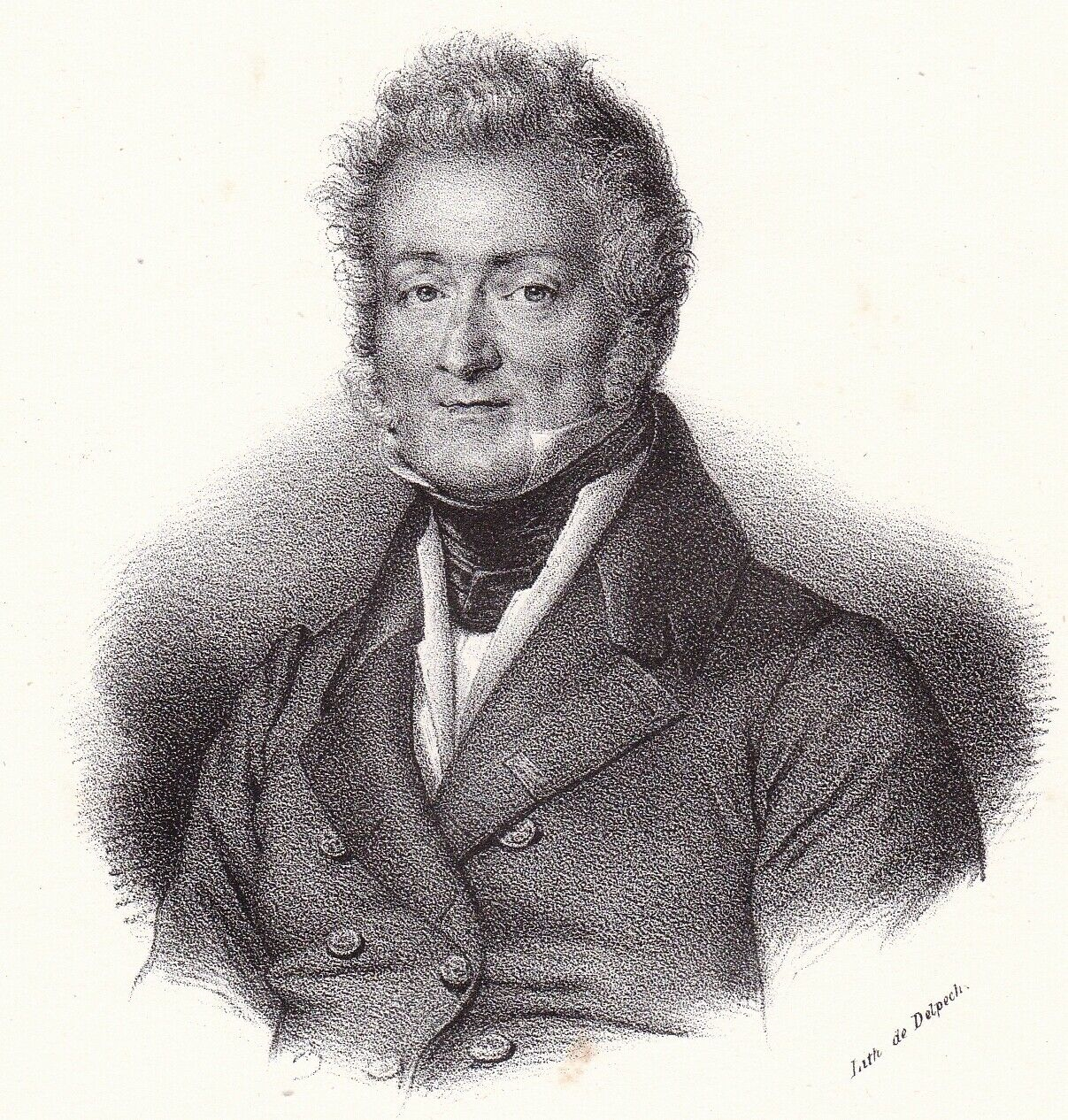
Ferdinando Paer, Italian composer

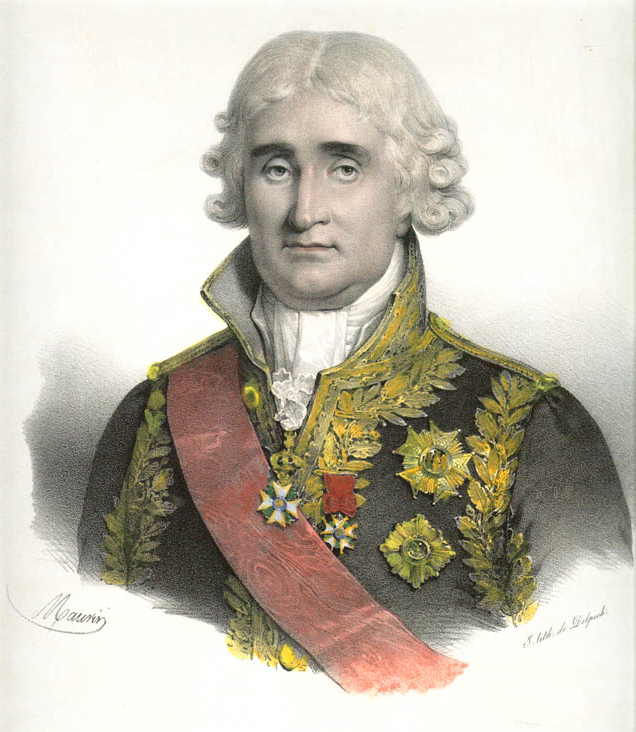
Portrait of Jean-Jacques-Régis de Cambacérès, French nobleman

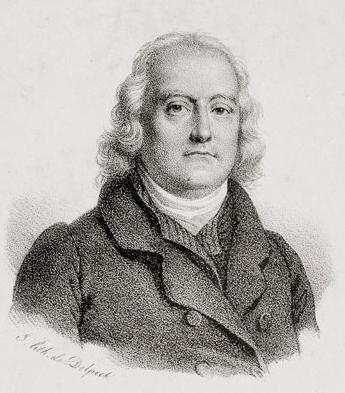
François Antoine de Boissy d'Anglas, French politician and writer

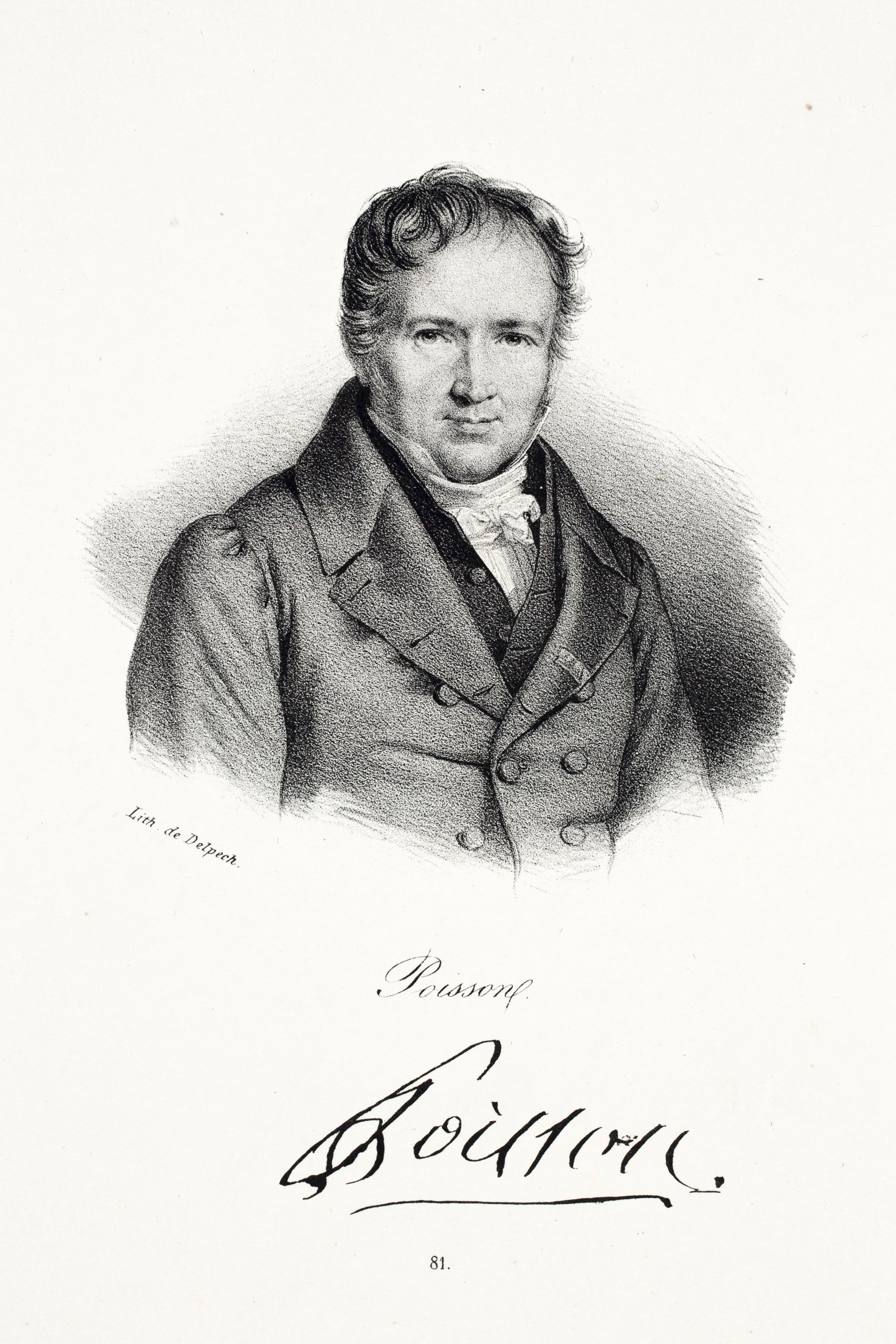
Siméon Denis Poisson, French mathematician

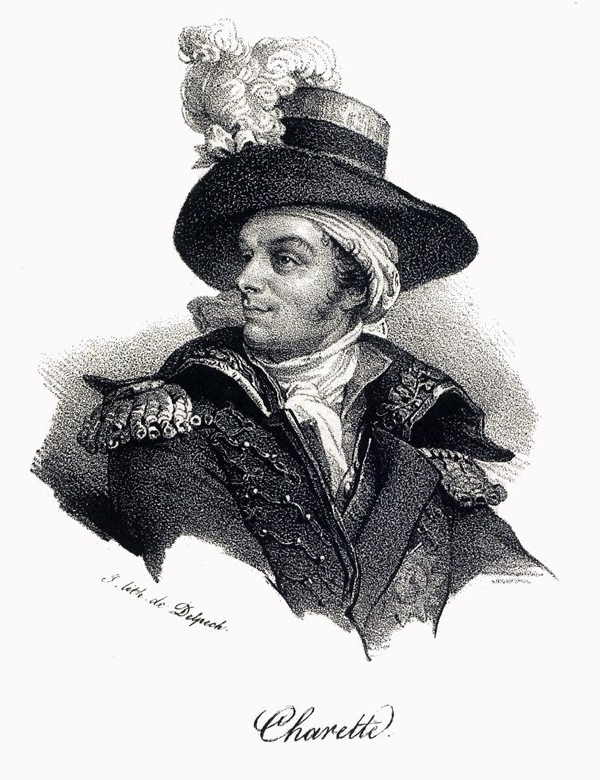
François de Charette, French Royalist soldier and politician
