= Saint-Marcel-d'Ardèche =

- Commune
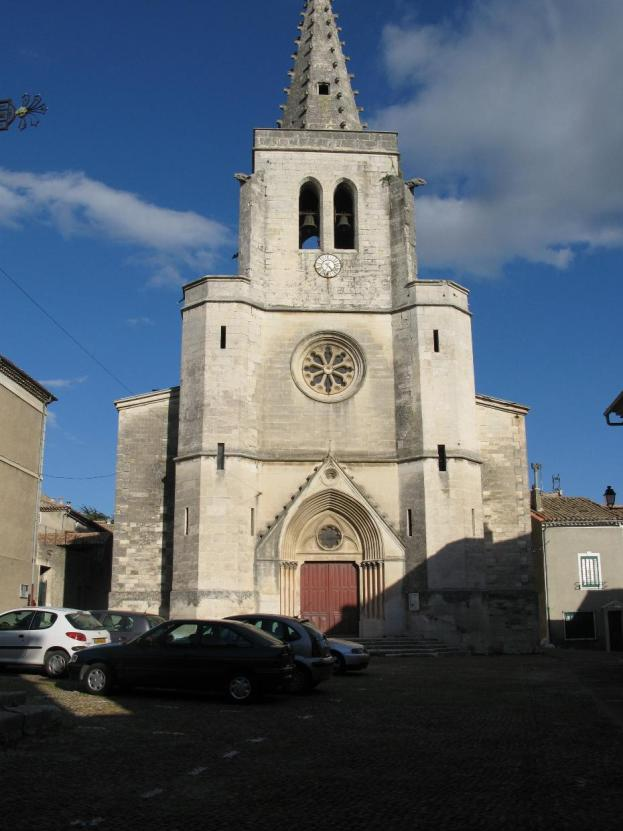
- The church in Saint-Marcel-d'Ardèche
- Location of Saint-Marcel-d'Ardèche
- Location within France Location within Auvergne-Rhône-Alpes
- Coordinates: 44°19′42″N 4°37′04″E
- Country: France
- Region: Auvergne-Rhône-Alpes
- Department: Ardèche
- Arrondissement: Privas
- Canton: Bourg-Saint-Andéol

Government
  - Mayor (2020–2026): Jérôme Laurent
- Area^{1}: 36.12 km^{2} (13.95 sq mi)
- Elevation: 132 m (433 ft)
- Highest elevation: 345 m (1,132 ft)
- Lowest elevation: 49 m (161 ft)
- Population (2023): 2,346
  - Density: 64.95/km^{2} (168.2/sq mi)
- Time zone: UTC+01:00 (CET)
  - Summer (DST): UTC+02:00 (CEST)
- INSEE/Postal code: 07264 /07700
- ^{1} French Land Register data, which excludes lakes, ponds, glaciers > 1 km^{2} (0.386 sq mi or 247 acres) and river estuaries.

Saint-Marcel-d'Ardèche is a commune in the Ardèche department in southern France.

== Population ==
Historical population
Year	Pop.	±% p.a.
1968	1,089	—
1975	1,140	+0.66%
1982	1,465	+3.65%
1990	1,781	+2.47%
1999	2,150	+2.11%
2007	2,376	+1.26%
2012	2,407	+0.26%
2017	2,375	−0.27%
2023	2,346	−0.20%
Source: INSEE

== See also ==
- Communes of the Ardèche department
