= Saint-Remèze =

- Commune
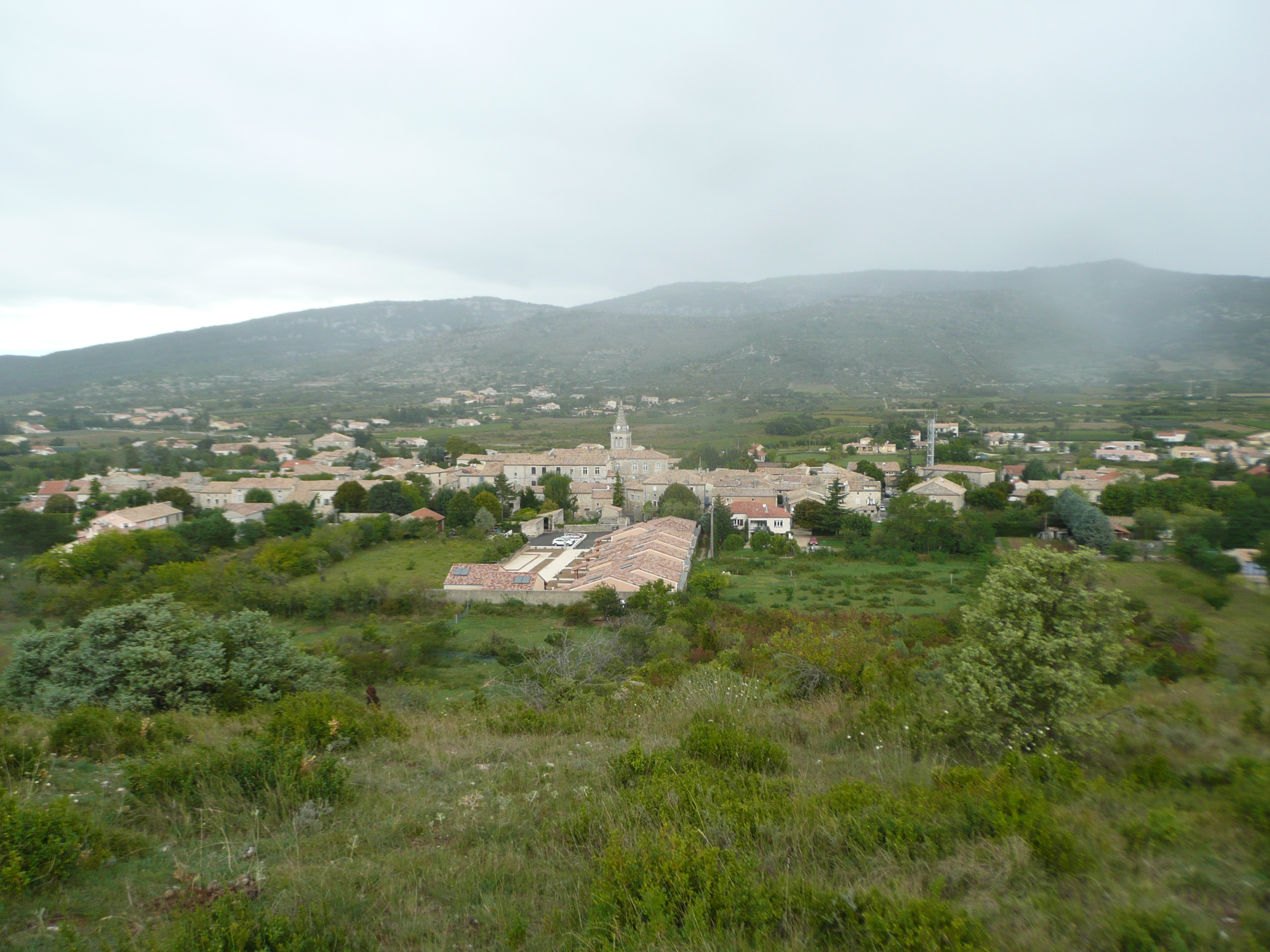
- A general view of Saint-Remèze

- Coat of arms
- Location of Saint-Remèze
- Location within France Location within Auvergne-Rhône-Alpes
- Coordinates: 44°23′36″N 4°30′09″E
- Country: France
- Region: Auvergne-Rhône-Alpes
- Department: Ardèche
- Arrondissement: Largentière
- Canton: Vallon-Pont-d'Arc

Government
  - Mayor (2020–2026): Patrick Meycelle
- Area^{1}: 42.69 km^{2} (16.48 sq mi)
- Elevation: 365 m (1,198 ft)
- Highest elevation: 663 m (2,175 ft)
- Lowest elevation: 40 m (130 ft)
- Population (2023): 847
  - Density: 19.8/km^{2} (51.4/sq mi)
- Time zone: UTC+01:00 (CET)
  - Summer (DST): UTC+02:00 (CEST)
- INSEE/Postal code: 07291 /07700
- ^{1} French Land Register data, which excludes lakes, ponds, glaciers > 1 km^{2} (0.386 sq mi or 247 acres) and river estuaries.

Saint-Remèze (French pronunciation: [sɛ̃ ʁəmɛz]; Occitan: Sant Remèsi) is a commune in the Ardèche department in southern France.

== Population ==
Historical population
| Year | Pop. | ±% p.a. |
|---|---|---|
| 1968 | 449 | — |
| 1975 | 436 | −0.42% |
| 1982 | 474 | +1.20% |
| 1990 | 454 | −0.54% |
| 1999 | 555 | +2.26% |
| 2007 | 826 | +5.10% |
| 2012 | 916 | +2.09% |
| 2017 | 871 | −1.00% |
| 2023 | 847 | −0.46% |
Source: INSEE

== See also ==
- Côtes du Vivarais AOC
- Communes of the Ardèche department
