= Jean Bonfils (bishop) =

French Roman Catholic bishop (1930–2026)

The Most Reverend Jean Marie Louis Bonfils S.M.A.
- Bishop Emeritus of Nice
- Church: Catholic Church
- Archdiocese: Marseille
- Diocese: Nice
- Appointed: 28 August 1998
- Term ended: 28 March 2005
- Predecessor: François Saint-Macary
- Successor: Louis Sankalé
- Other post: Apostolic Administrator of Ajaccio (2011–2012)
- Previous post: Bishop of Viviers (1992–1998)

Orders
- Ordination: 7 December 1954
- Consecration: 10 January 1993 by Jean Honoré, Jacques Jullien and Henri Brincard

Personal details
- Born: 15 February 1930 Montpellier, France
- Died: 12 May 2026 (aged 96) Nice, France
- Motto: Apparuit Humanitas Salvatoris
- Coat of arms

Jean Marie Louis Bonfils, S.M.A. (15 February 1930 – 12 May 2026) was a French Roman Catholic prelate, who served as Bishop of Viviers from 1992 to 1998 and as Bishop of Nice from 1998 until his retirement in 2005. He later served as Apostolic Administrator of the Ajaccio from 2011 to 2012.

== Early life and priesthood ==
Bonfils was born in Montpellier, France on 15 February 1930. He entered the Society of African Missions (S.M.A.) and was ordained a priest on 7 December 1954.

He taught theology in Lyon (1958–1962) and at the Major Seminary of Ouidah in Benin (1962–1964). He later served as master of novices in Chanly, Belgium (1964–1968), and held leadership roles within the Missions africaines of Lyon. From 1978 to 1984 he was secretary general of the Conference of Major Superiors of France. Between 1987 and 1992 he served at the Congregation for Institutes of Consecrated Life and Societies of Apostolic Life in Rome.

== Bishop of Viviers ==
On 28 November 1992, Pope John Paul II appointed Bonfils Bishop of Viviers. He received episcopal consecration on 10 January 1993; the principal consecrator was Jean Honoré, assisted by Bishops Jacques Jullien and Henri Brincard.

During his episcopate, he was involved in missionary cooperation within the Bishops' Conference of France.

== Bishop of Nice ==
On 28 August 1998, Pope John Paul II appointed him Bishop of Nice. He served in that capacity until 28 March 2005, when his resignation was accepted upon reaching the canonical retirement age.

== Apostolic administrator of Ajaccio ==
On 23 September 2011, he was appointed Apostolic Administrator of the Diocese of Ajaccio. He served until 22 February 2012.

During this period, he was publicly involved in pastoral discussions reported in French Catholic media, including clarifications regarding sacramental practice.

== Death ==
Bonfils died in Nice on 12 May 2026, at the age of 96.

Catholic Church titles
Preceded by François Saint-Macary	Bishop of Nice; 1998–2005	Succeeded by Louis Sankalé
Preceded by Jean Hermil	Bishop of Viviers; 1992–1998	Succeeded by François Blondel
