= Bermond d'Anduze =

Bermond d'Anduze may refer to:

- Bermond d'Anduze (bishop of Viviers) (died c. 1244)
- Bermond d'Anduze (bishop of Sisteron) (died 1214)
