= Adalard (bishop of Le Puy) =

Adalard's ex-dono in a book he gifted to his cathedral, now in the national library

Adalard (or Adelard) was the bishop of Le Puy from at least 919 to 924, although the exact dates of his office are unknown. He succeeded Norbert I, who is last recorded as bishop in 915.

Adalard's background is unknown, but a connection with Autun is possible. In 919, he witnessed the testament of Bishop Hervé de Vergy of Autun. He may have been a son of Adalard the Seneschal. Adalard's successor, Hector, may have been his sister's son, since bishoprics were in those days often passed down by avuncular succession. A connection with Lyon has also been suspected, since Adalard acquired a manuscript that was copied from an exemplar annotated by Florus of Lyon. Possibly he was educated in Lyon.

In April 924, King Rudolf, with the agreement of Count William of the Auvergne, granted Adalard the lordship of Le Puy with full jurisdiction, including the right to mint coins, making Adalard the first bishop to also exercise temporal rule over Le Puy and its district. The royal diploma of this grant is the earliest source to qualify Le Puy, the ancient Anicium, as a burgus. Although Adalard himself did not take the title, future bishops would call themselves counts of Velay.

Adalard commissioned the manuscript now shelfmarked Paris, Bibliothèque nationale de France, Latin 1452, which contains a juridical texts, namely, the Collectio Dionysio-Hadriana, Collectio Lugdunensis and the Sirmondian constitutions. He later donated it to Le Puy Cathedral, placing his ex-dono and a book curse on folio 2r. Of Adalard's juridical interests, Pierre Chambert-Protat writes, "Bishop Adelard of Le Puy might have been a fine jurist, but he is only known by three mentions of his name, so it remains impossible to determine the rough duration of his bishopric or to study his person or actions."

In 935, a noblewoman named Blismodis donated a small cell to the church of Le Puy in honour of Bishops Adalard, Hector and Godescalc.

Catholic Church titles
Preceded by Norbert I	Bishop of Le Puy; 919–924	Succeeded by Hector
