= Viviers, Ardèche =

Viviers
- Commune
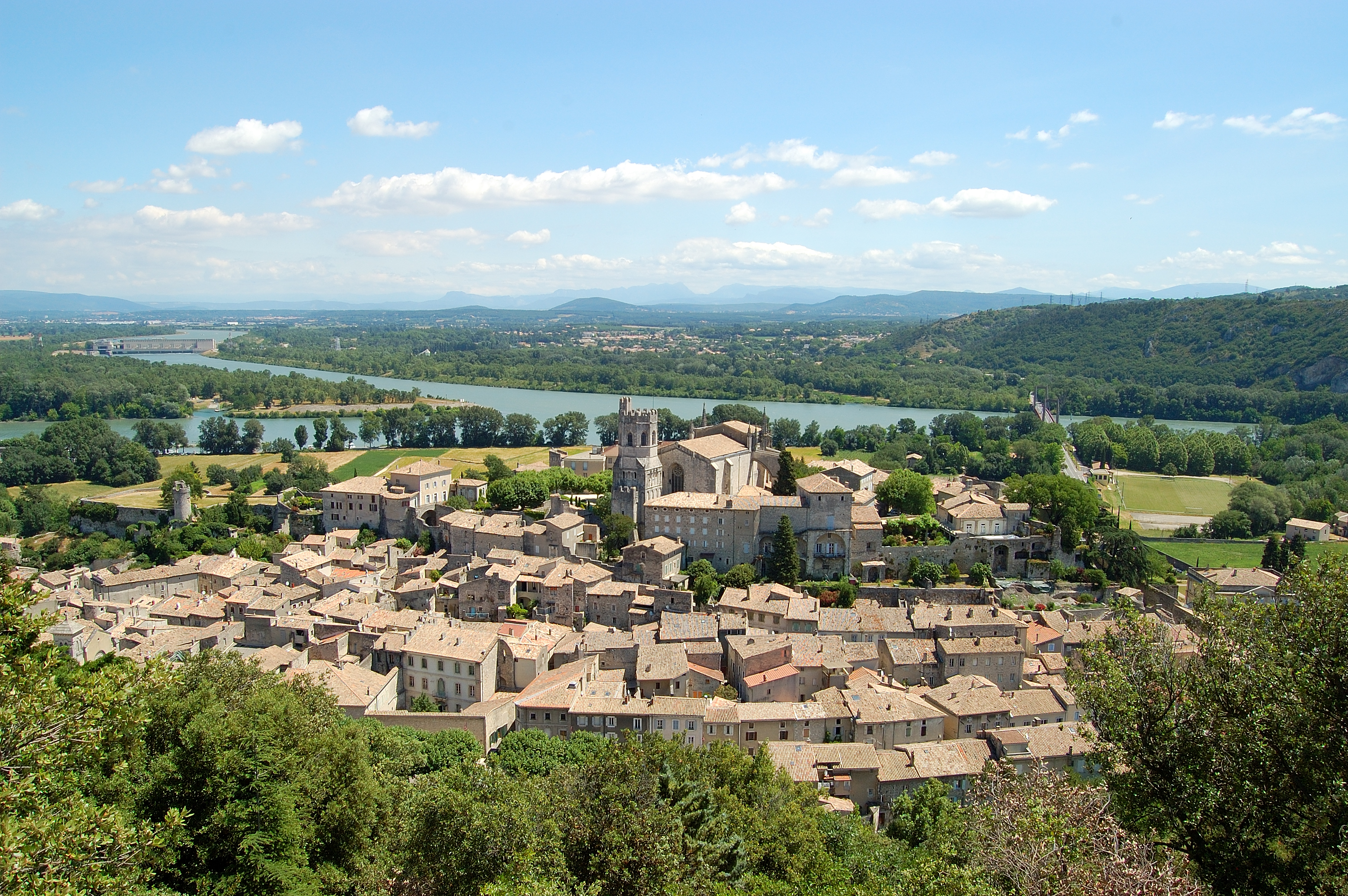

- Coat of arms
- Location of Viviers
- Location within France Location within Auvergne-Rhône-Alpes
- Coordinates: 44°29′01″N 4°41′23″E
- Country: France
- Region: Auvergne-Rhône-Alpes
- Department: Ardèche
- Arrondissement: Privas
- Canton: Bourg-Saint-Andéol
- Intercommunality: Rhône aux Gorges de l'Ardèche

Government
  - Mayor (2020–2026): Martine Mattei
- Area^{1}: 34.15 km^{2} (13.19 sq mi)
- Elevation: 71 m (233 ft)
- Highest elevation: 400 m (1,300 ft)
- Lowest elevation: 55 m (180 ft)
- Population (2023): 3,633
  - Density: 106.4/km^{2} (275.5/sq mi)
- Time zone: UTC+01:00 (CET)
  - Summer (DST): UTC+02:00 (CEST)
- INSEE/Postal code: 07346 /07220
- ^{1} French Land Register data, which excludes lakes, ponds, glaciers > 1 km^{2} (0.386 sq mi or 247 acres) and river estuaries.

Viviers (French pronunciation: [vivje], also Viviers-sur-Rhône; Occitan: Vivièrs) is a village in the department of Ardèche in southern France. It is known for its medieval cathedral and views over the Rhone river.

== Population ==
Historical population
Year	Pop.	±% p.a.
1968	3,389	—
1975	3,194	−0.84%
1982	3,282	+0.39%
1990	3,407	+0.47%
1999	3,413	+0.02%
2007	3,869	+1.58%
2012	3,908	+0.20%
2017	3,730	−0.93%
2023	3,633	−0.44%
Source: INSEE

== History ==
The village's name is derived from the Latin Vivarium, referring to fish farming ponds built on the banks of the Rhône by the Romans to supply Alba Helviorum. A Roman-built bridge designed to facilitate trade in the area still stands near the village's center.

Viviers became the capital of the Gaulish Helvii tribe following the decline of nearby Alba-la-Romaine. In the fifth century, Viviers was incorporated into the Kingdom of the Burgundians and was later conquered by the Franks.

In the late fifth century, the fortified town became a powerful episcopal seat and the capital of the pays Vivarais. It remains the see of the Bishop of Viviers. In the 6th century, Venant de Viviers served as the Bishop of Viviers.

In the 9th century, Viviers and Vivarais passed to the Kingdom of Provence and eventually became an integral part of the Kingdom of Arles from 933 to 1032. The city was part of the Holy Roman Empire from 1032 until 1307. After a gradual process lasting from 1305-1308, the area passed to the Kingdom of France and was made a county. From the 15th century onward, its Bishops held the titles Count of Viviers and Prince of Donzère and Châteauneuf-du-Rhône.

After its incorporation into the Kingdom of France, Viviers reinforced its walls, sparing it from destruction during the Hundred Years' War. In the early 16th century, Claude of Tournon was made Bishop. As chaplain to Anne of Brittany, he invested greatly into the town. Later in the same century, Noel Albert, an eminent citizen of Viviers, seized the town for Protestantism, bringing it into the French Wars of Religion and ransacking the Cathedral. After Albert's execution and the end of the conflict, Viviers' profile was significantly reduced. The bishops, who had fled the city during the war, only returned to Viviers in the 18th century, after the construction of a large new Bishop's Palace.

Viviers emerged from the French Revolution unscathed as its Bishop, Charles de La Font de Savine, had been one of the few Catholic bishops to pledge allegiance to the revolutionary government. In 1858, Joseph-Hippolyte Guibert gifted three Gobelins tapestries to the Cathedral, where they remain. The 19th century saw industrial expansion in Viviers and slight population growth. Today, the town is a center of tourism, owing to its many listed monuments, including the medieval Cathedral of St. Vincent and the Grande Rue, a street lined with 18th-century townhouses.

== See also ==
- Communes of the Ardèche department
- Diocese of Viviers
- Viviers Cathedral
