= Hervé Giraud =

French Catholic prelate (born 1957)

The Most Reverend Hervé Giraud
- Archbishop-Bishop of Viviers; Prelate of Mission de France
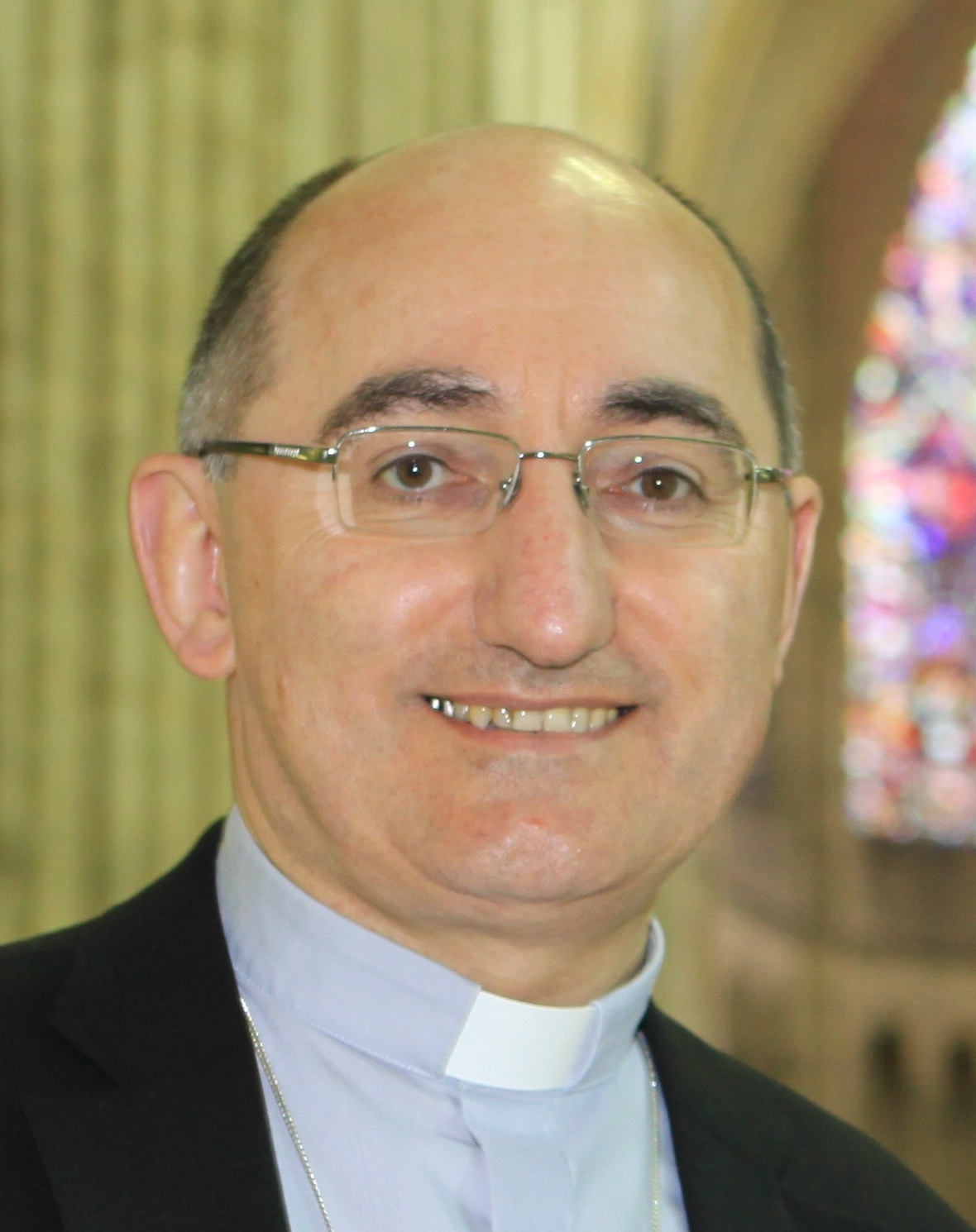
- Church: Roman Catholic Church
- Archdiocese: Sens
- See: Sens
- Appointed: 13 March 2024
- Term ended: 21 May 2025
- Predecessor: Jean-Louis Balsa
- Previous posts: Titular Bishop of Silli (2003-07); Auxiliary Bishop of Lyon (2003-07); Coadjutor Bishop of Soissons (2007-08); Bishop of Soissons (2008-15); Archbishop of Sens (2015–2024)

Orders
- Ordination: 24 September 1985 by Jean Hermil
- Consecration: 25 May 2003 by Philippe Barbarin

Personal details
- Born: Hervé Jean Robert Giraud; 26 February 1957 (age 69) Tournon-sur-Rhône, Ardèche, France
- Education: Claude Bernard University Lyon 1; Pontifical Gregorian University; Institut Catholique de Paris
- Motto: Ressuscités avec le Christ
- Coat of arms

Hervé Jean Robert Giraud (born 26 February 1957) is a French prelate of the Catholic Church who has been named Bishop of Viviers with the personal title of archbishop. He previously served as Auxiliary Bishop of Lyon from 2003 to 2007, then as Bishop of Soissons from 2008 to 2015, following three months as coadjutor. He was Archbishop of Sens from 2015 to 2024.

== Biography ==
Hervé Giraud was born to Pierre Giraud and Marie-Thérèse née Minodier on 26 February 1957 in Tournon-sur-Rhône, Ardèche, a village where his family has lived for four centuries. From the age of eight he worked in the family restaurant where his father was the chef and his mother the waitress. After studying locally, he completed his baccalaureate in Paray-le-Monial in 1974 and general university diploma in Lyon in 1977. He taught mathematics in La Clayette in 1978/1979. He studied at the Interdiocesan Seminary Saint-Irénée in Sainte-Foy-lès-Lyon from 1980 to 1985. He was ordained a priest for the Diocese of Viviers on 24 September 1985 by Jean Hermil, Bishop of Viviers.

He earned a licentiate in moral theology from the Pontifical Gregorian University in 1987, and while in Rome he was chaplain at the church of Saint-Louis-des-Français. In 1987/1988 he worked toward his doctorate at the Catholic Institute of Paris. He was professor of moral theology at the Institut pastoral d'études religeuses de Lyon and at the Abbey of Champagne from 1988 to 1992. As an academic specialist in moral theology he has been described as a disciple of the Silesian Xavier Thévenot. From 1993 to 1997 he was a member of the animating team at the Saint-Irénée Interdiocesan Seminary. He then was Superior of the University Seminary of Lyon from 1997 to 2003 and in 1999 also secretary of the National Council of Major Seminaries. Alongside his academic assignments, he was parochial vicar and student chaplain in Privas from 1988 to 1992. He was a member of the Commission for Ongoing Formation of the diocese of Viviers from 1991 to 2000; member of the Commission d'Ethique de l'Association Française pour le Dépistage et la Prévention des Handicaps de l'Enfant at the French Ministry of Health from 1991 to 1994; member of the National Council for the Pastoral Care of the Family from 1997 to 1999; secretary of the Episcopal Commission for Ordained Ministries from 1999 to 2002; and National Chaplain for Marriage Preparation Centers for 2002/2003.

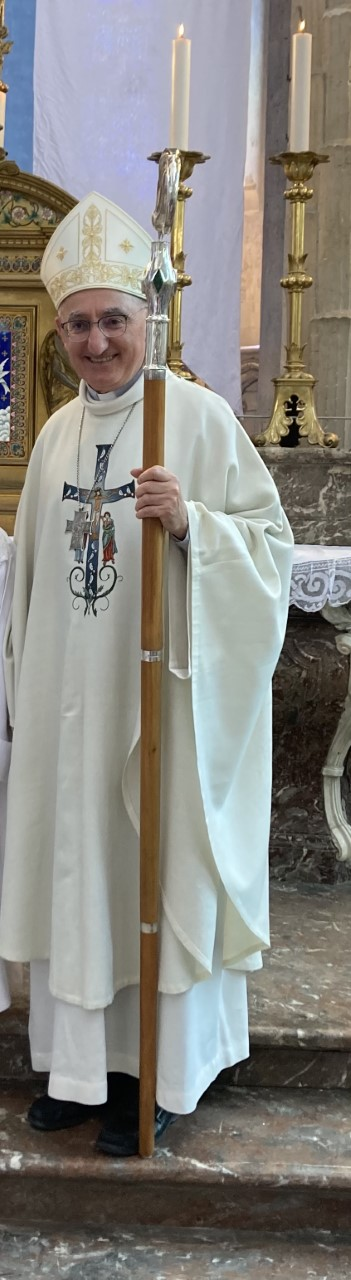
Giraud in 2022

Pope John Paul II appointed him Auxiliary Bishop of Lyon and titular bishop of Silli on 15 April 2003. He received his episcopal consecration on 25 May from Philippe Barbarin, Archbishop of Lyon. He was then the youngest bishop in France. Within the Bishops' Conference of France (CEF), he was elected to a three-year term as president of the Commission for ordained ministers and laity on church missions for the CEF in 2005 and re-elected in 2008.

When Giraud, then 50 years old, had spent almost half of his life in Lyon, Pope Benedict XVI appointed him Coadjutor Bishop of Soissons on 13 November 2007 and Giraud succeeded as bishop there on 22 February 2008. In 2011, he was elected president of the CEF's Council for Communications. In March 2014, he served on the Ecumenical Jury at the Cannes Film Festival.

On 5 March 2015, Pope Francis named him Archbishop of Sens and prelate of the Territorial Prelature of the Mission de France at Pontigny. He was installed in those positions on 19 April. In a 2023 essay on Pope Francis' counsel on homosexuality, he wrote that Francis does not proceed from ideology but "in line with the search for a just Christian attitude in which he wants to lead the entire Catholic Church" and described the need to understand the radical nature of the evangelical requirement to love each person. In his view the way Francis raises the question repeatedly provides "the example of freedom of speech which invites us to break the deadlock of silence".

On 13 March 2024, he was named Bishop of Viviers, with the right to continue using the title of archbishop. His installation there is scheduled for 14 April.

Giraud was the first French bishop to have a social media presence, including the Twitter account @mgrgiraud. The brief homilies he posted there were also published in 2014 as a book, Twitthomélies. For presenting a new version of what a bishop can be, he has been nicknamed "l'évêque 2.0", that is, "bishop 2.0".

== See also ==
- Catholic Church in France
