= Hector (bishop of Le Puy) =

Hector (or Haector) was the bishop of Le Puy in the period 924–935, but the exact dates of his office are unknown. He succeeded Adalard, who was bishop in 924, and was succeeded by Godescalc, by 935 at the latest. In 924, King Rudolf granted the county of Le Puy to the bishop, making Hector the second count-bishop.

Hector had a highly unusual name in western Europe in the 10th century. It may suggest a connection with the Hector who was governor of Marseille in the 7th century. He certainly belonged to the family of the viscounts of Vienne, but his exact relationship is uncertain. He was most likely the son of Viscount Ratburn I of Vienne and his wife Gerberga. He was in that case named for his maternal grandfather. Bishop Adalard, his predecessor, would have been his maternal uncle and his nephew Guy, the son of his sister Gerberga and Count Fulk II of Anjou, was also later bishop of Le Puy. Guy may have been elected at Hector's death, since such an avunculate was typical at the time, but he would have been too young to take up the office immediately. Bishop Hector also had a great nephew named Hector.

On this reconstruction, Hector must have died young. Jean Mabillon, therefore, argued on chronological grounds that it was more likely that Hector was a brother of Ratburn I than a son. This would make him a son of Viscount Berlion I and a brother of Archbishop Sobon of Vienne.

The date of Hector's death is highly uncertain, being based on a document of uncertain date. In March of the sixth year of Rudolf's reign, a noblewoman named Blismodis donated a small cell to the church of Le Puy in honour of Bishops Adalard, Hector and Godescalc, indicating that by then he had died and been succeeded by Godescalc. The charter recording this transaction is usually dated to 935 on the grounds that southern chartes typical only recognized Rudolf as king from the death of the deposed Charles III in 929. Many sources, including Gallia Christiana, assuming that Rudolf's reign is being dated from his assumption of the throne or his coronation a few months later, place the charter of Blismods in 928 or 929, thus putting Hector's death no later these years and perhaps as early as 927.

Of Hector's acts as bishop, no record has survived. Dalmas de Beaumont, the prior of Saint-Gilles de Chamalières in the diocese of Le Puy, began his reform of the Abbey of Saint-Gilles in 933 or somewhat earlier.

Catholic Church titles
| Preceded by Adalard | Bishop of Le Puy fl. 928 | Succeeded by Godescalc |
