= Hermil =

Hermil may refer to:

- Harmil, an island in Eritrea's Dahlak Archipelago
- Hermel in Lebanon
- Hermel District in Lebanon
- Jean Hermil, bishop of Viviers
