= Bermond (bishop of Viviers) =

Lord my provider

Bermond d'Anduze was elected bishop of Viviers, France, in August 1222 and died probably in 1244. He should not be confused with his close relative Bermond d'Anduze who was also a 13th-century French bishop.

He was born into the powerful Anduze family who ruled both Civil and Church politics in the Nimes region. Following the excommunication and ruin of Raymond VI of Toulouse his diocese claimed a third of the lordship of Largentière. The advent of the young Raymond VII, heir of Raymond VI wanted to recover the fiefs of his father, so Bermond became the target of the attacks of Toulouse supporters. After a failed attempt to capture him in late 1222, Raymond VII returned in force the following July and captured the city of Nimes. Bishop Bermond appealed to Pope Honorius III who invited the young Count of Toulouse to return the property of the Bishop of Viviers; if he refused to obey, he would run the risk of never getting absolution. The threat was a real one as Raymond had seen the impact of excommunication on his father, however, Raymond VII maintained his troops in the city and on 26 February 1225, the papal ultimatum still remained ineffective. It was then that, at the request of Honorius III, King Louis VIII of France marched towards the Languedoc with an army of 100,000 men in 1226 and recovered Largentière. Later, following the Treaty of Paris of 1229, the Seneschal of Beaucaire summoned Bermond as bishop of Viviers to recognize a vassal of King Louis IX. Bermond protested and the Seneschal seized his diocese and his own property. Bermond Anduze complained to Frederick II, Holy Roman Emperor, but did not receive help. In 1235, he therefore set off for Germany, joined Frederick in Haguenau and obtained from him, in January 1236, a bull confirming all goods and all the privileges of his church. In respect of Raymond VII, Bermond still held a grudge so on 25 July 1240, he asked Zoen, archpriest of Bologna, and papal legate to excommunicate him. Apart from his involvement with the Count of Toulouse and the King of France, Bermond Anduze showed great skill as an administrator and arbitrator:

- He ended on 8 September 1223, the trial between his brother, Pierre Bermond IV and Vierne, his sister, regarding tolls in the town of Alès, France.
- In 1228 he sat on the fourth Council of Orange.
- On 5 May 1231, he wrote to Pope Gregory IX, recommending the cause of Stephen, Bishop of Die; there was talk of canonization.
- In 1242, finally, he ended a lawsuit between his church and Saint-Marcel d'Ardèche and was the commander of arbiter between Jales and the priory of Bourg-Saint-Andéol.
