= William of Falgar =

French Franciscan theologian

William of Falgar (died 1297 or 1298) was a Franciscan theologian from south-west France, a follower of Bonaventure.

He entered the Franciscan Order at Toulouse. He became bishop of Viviers in 1296.
