= Louis-François de la Baume de Suze =

French bishop

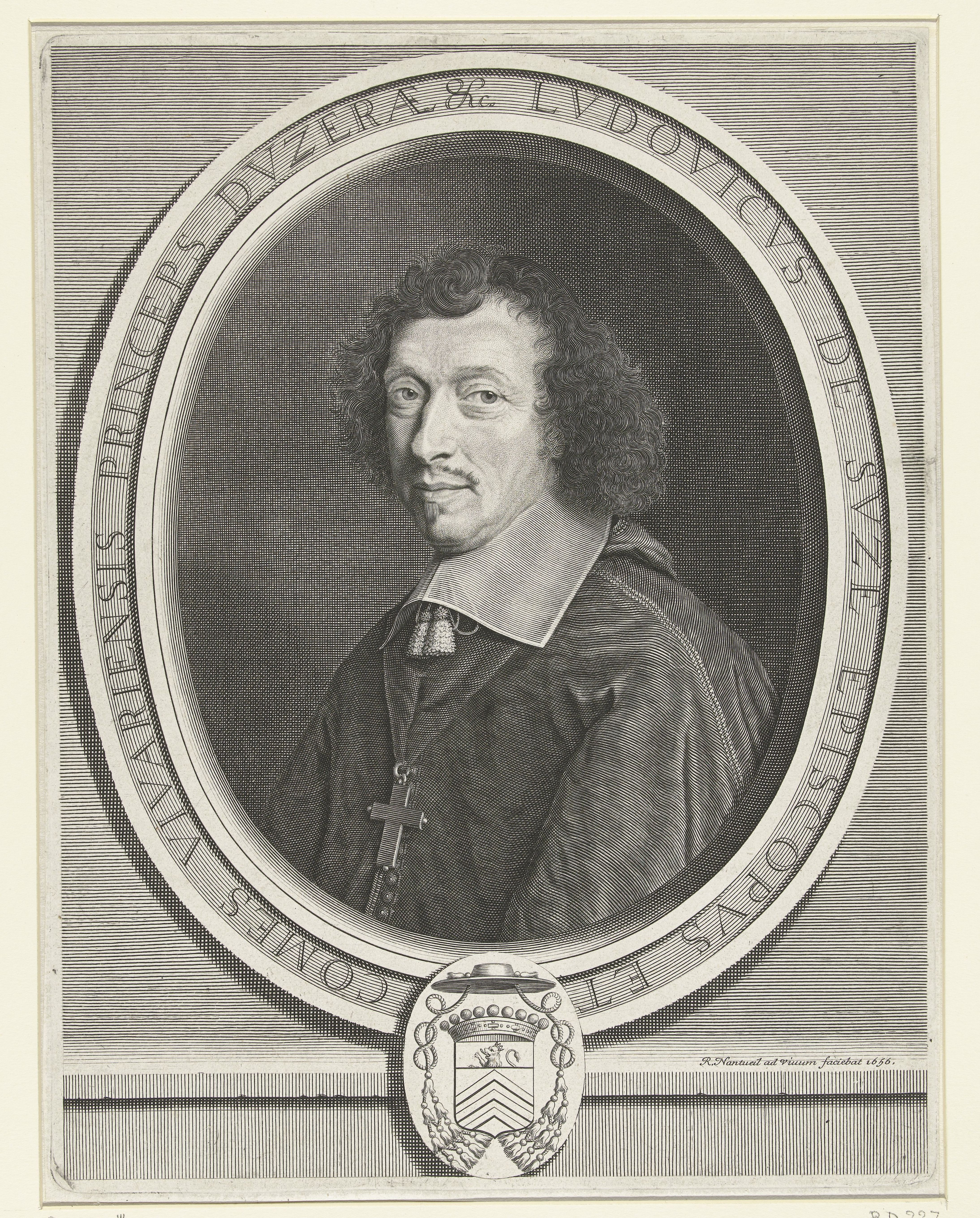
Louis-François de la Baume de Suze

Louis-François de la Baume de Suze (1595–1690) was a French bishop.

== Biography ==
Louis-François de la Baume de Suze was born in 1595. He was made coadjutor bishop of Viviers in 1618, also becoming titular bishop of Popmpeiopolis at this time. He was consecrated as a bishop on May 14, 1618. He became Bishop of Viviers on April 6, 1621. He died on September 5, 1690.
