= Viviers Cathedral =

Cathedral in Viviers, France

Coordinates: 44°28′55″N 4°41′26″E

Viviers Cathedral Cathédrale Saint-Vincent de Viviers
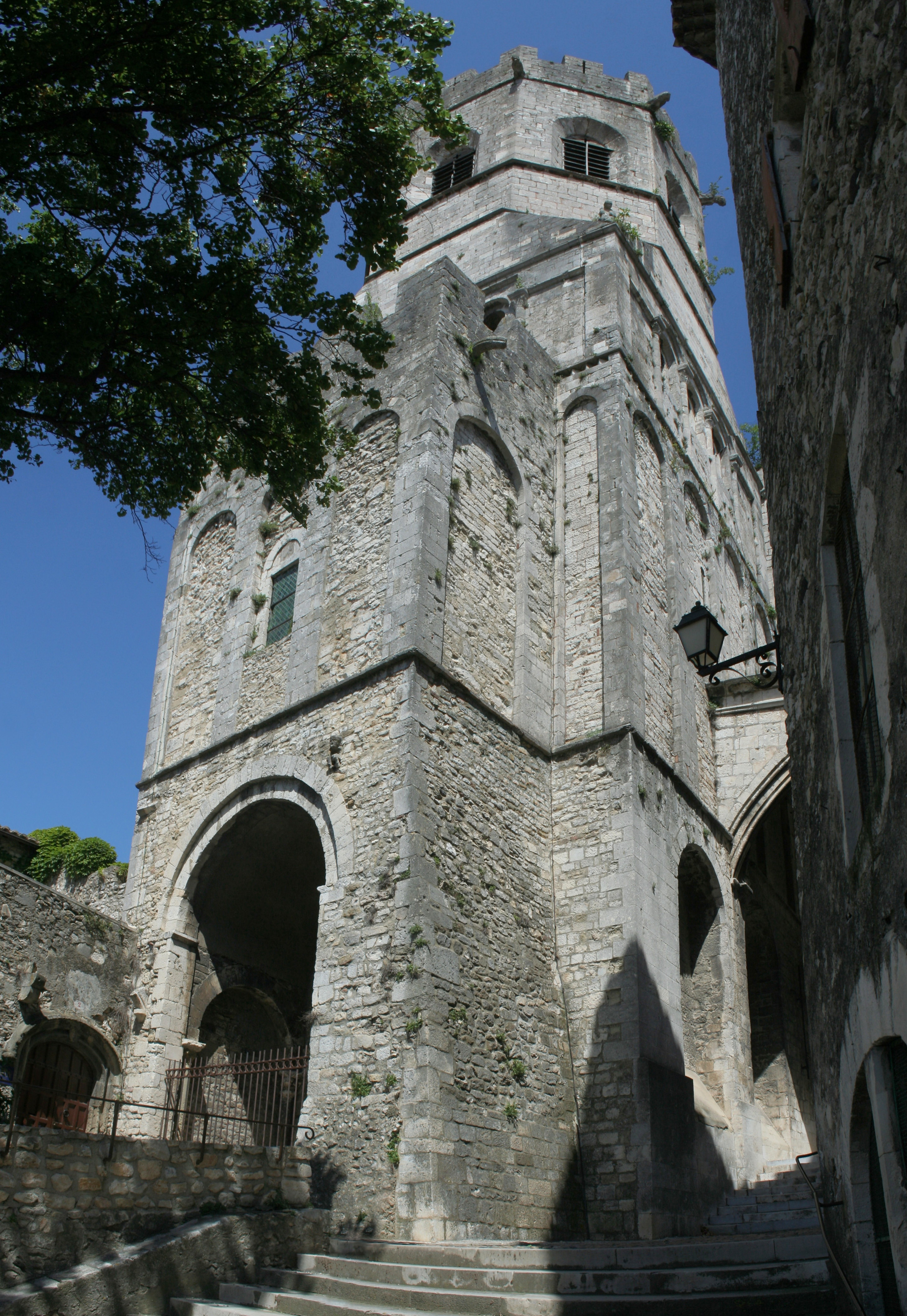
- Tower of Viviers Cathedral

Religion
- Affiliation: Roman Catholic Church
- Province: Bishop of Viviers
- Region: Ardèche
- Rite: Roman
- Ecclesiastical or organisational status: Cathedral
- Status: Active

Location
- Location: Viviers, France
- Interactive map of Viviers Cathedral; Cathédrale Saint-Vincent de Viviers

Architecture
- Type: church
- Style: Romanesque, Gothic
- Groundbreaking: 11th century
- Completed: 18th century

Viviers Cathedral (French: Cathédrale Saint-Vincent de Viviers) is a Roman Catholic church, dedicated to Saint Vincent, in the town of Viviers in the department of Ardèche, France. It is the seat of the Bishop of Viviers.

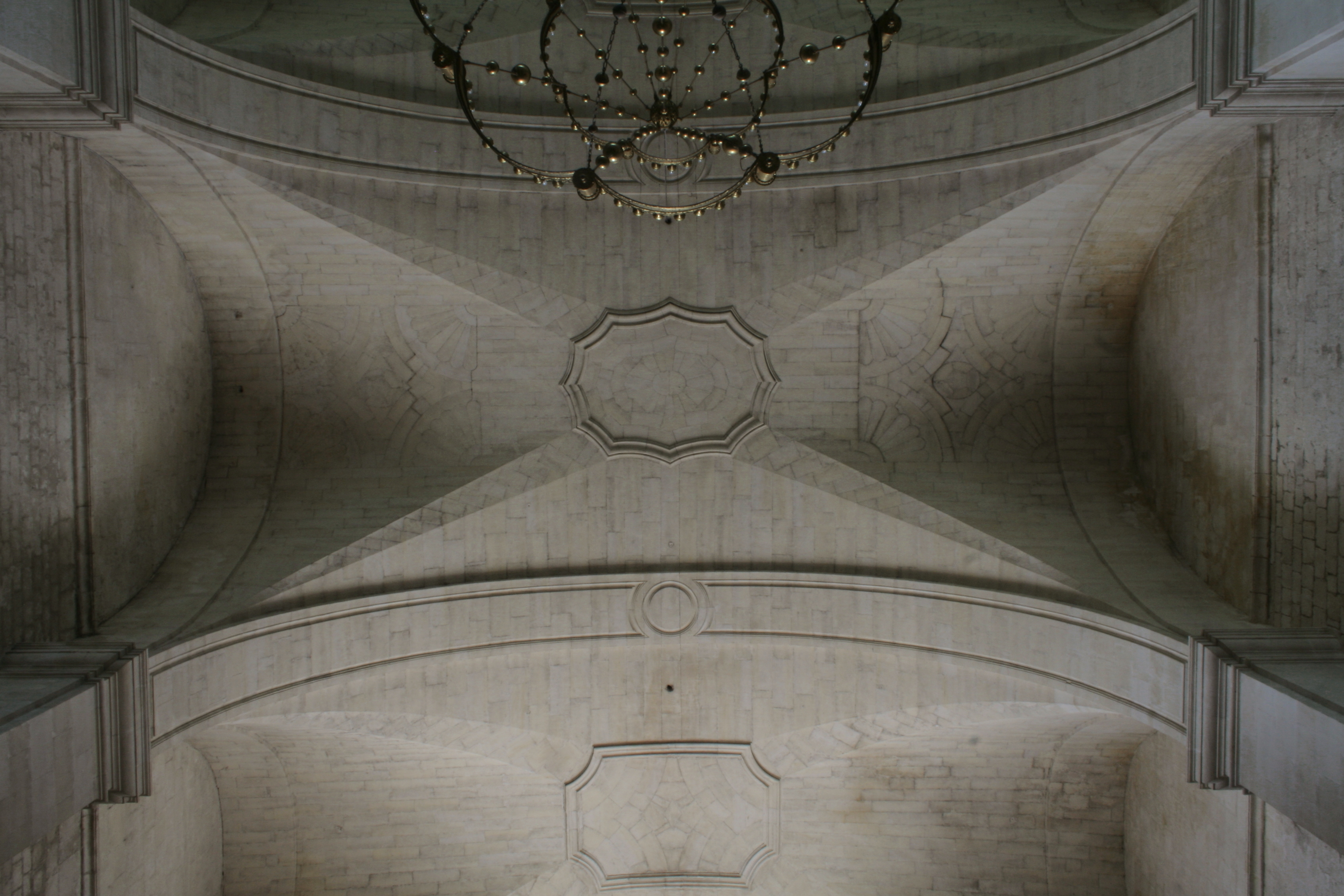
The vaulted ceiling reconstructed in the 18th century

The construction of the tower dates from the 11th century, and the greater part of the rest of the building from the 12th century. The vaulted ceiling was destroyed during the Wars of Religion of the 16th century, and was not reconstructed until the 18th century, when the work was carried out by Jean-Baptiste Franque.

The cathedral has been protected as a monument historique since 9 August 1906.

On the night of 25–26 September 2021 lightning struck and destroyed one of the spires of the cathedral, which was already undergoing restoration after the earthquake of November 2019.
