= Roman Bridge of Viviers =

Bridge in Viviers, France

Roman Bridge of Viviers Pont romain de Viviers
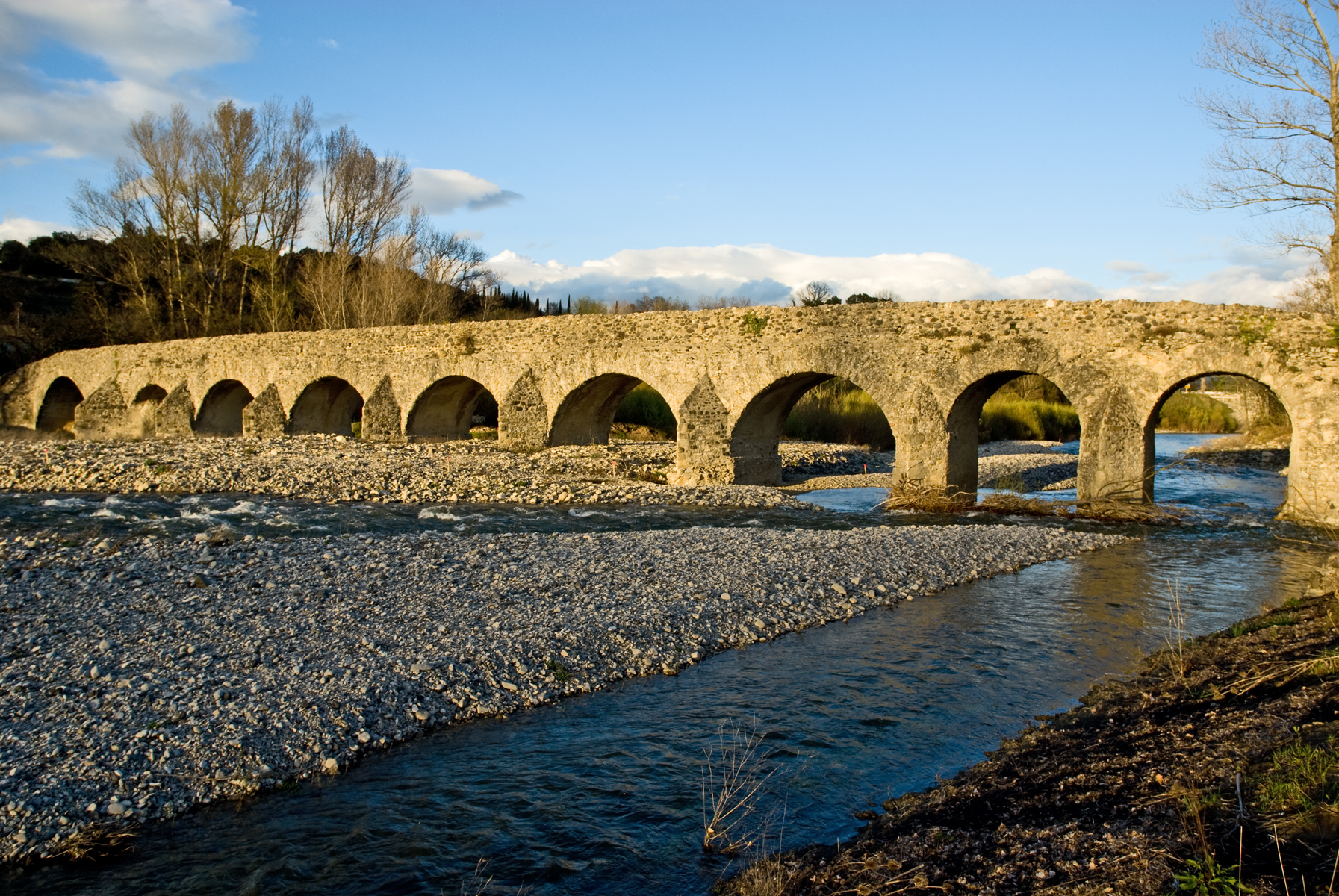
- Coordinates: 44°29′18.7″N 4°40′18.2″E
- Crosses: Escoutay
- Locale: Viviers, Ardèche, France
- Heritage status: Monument historique (1986)

Location
- Interactive map of Roman Bridge of Viviers

The Roman Bridge (French: pont romain) is a bridge in France within the area around Viviers, in the department of Ardèche in the region of Rhône-Alpes.

== History ==
The main part of the bridge dates to the Roman period and exhibits characteristics typical of bridges built in the region from the 2nd century onward. Damage, likely caused by various floods, necessitated the replacement of three of the original arches.

It was classified as a monument historique on 13 August 1986.

== General references ==
- Prade, Marcel (1988). Les ponts, monuments historiques: inventaire, description, histoire des ponts et ponts-aqueducs de France, protégés au titre des monuments historiques [Bridges as historical monuments: inventory, description, and history of bridges and aqueduct bridges in France protected as historical monuments] (in French). Errance. p. 71. ISBN 978-2-903442-81-1.
