= Henri Brincard =

Catholic bishop

- Bishop of Le Puy-en-Velay
- Church: Roman Catholic Church
- See: Diocese of Le Puy-en-Velay
- In office: 1988 - 2014
- Predecessor: Louis Cornet
- Successor: Vacant

Orders
- Ordination: 23 August 1975
- Consecration: 2 October 1988 by Pierre Plateau

Personal details
- Born: 18 November 1939 Savonnières, France
- Died: 14 November 2014 (aged 74) Caluire-et-Cuire, France

Henri Marie Raoul Brincard (18 November 1939 – 14 November 2014) was a French Roman Catholic bishop.

Ordained to the priesthood on 23 August 1975, Brincard was named bishop of the Le Puy-en-Velay on 8 August 1988 and was ordained bishop on 2 October 1988.
