= Jacques Jullien =

French Roman Catholic archbishop

His Excellency Jacques Jullien
- Archbishop of Rennes
- Church: Roman Catholic Church
- See: Archdiocese of Rennes

Orders
- Ordination: 3 April 1954
- Consecration: 12 November 1978

Personal details
- Born: 7 May 1929 Brest, France
- Died: 10 December 2012 (aged 83) Rennes, France

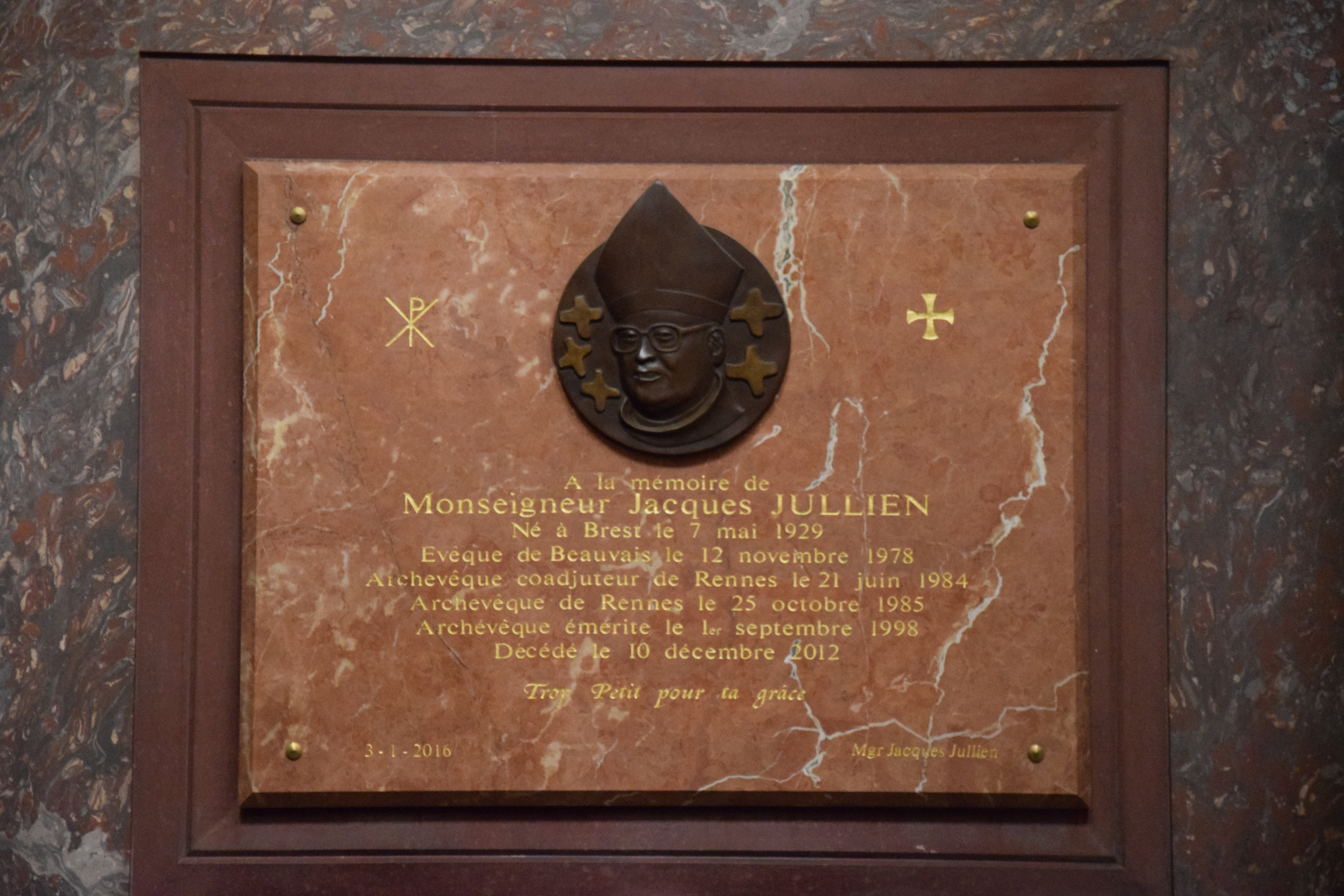
Interior of cathedral Saint-Pierre de Rennes 2024

Jacques André Marie Jullien (7 May 1929 – 10 December 2012) was the Roman Catholic archbishop of the Roman Catholic Archdiocese of Rennes, France.

Ordained to the priesthood in 1954, Jullien was named bishop in 1978 and resigned in 1998.
