= Diocese of Viviers =

Diocese of the Catholic Church

Diocese of Viviers Dioecesis Vivariensis Diocèse de Viviers

Catholic
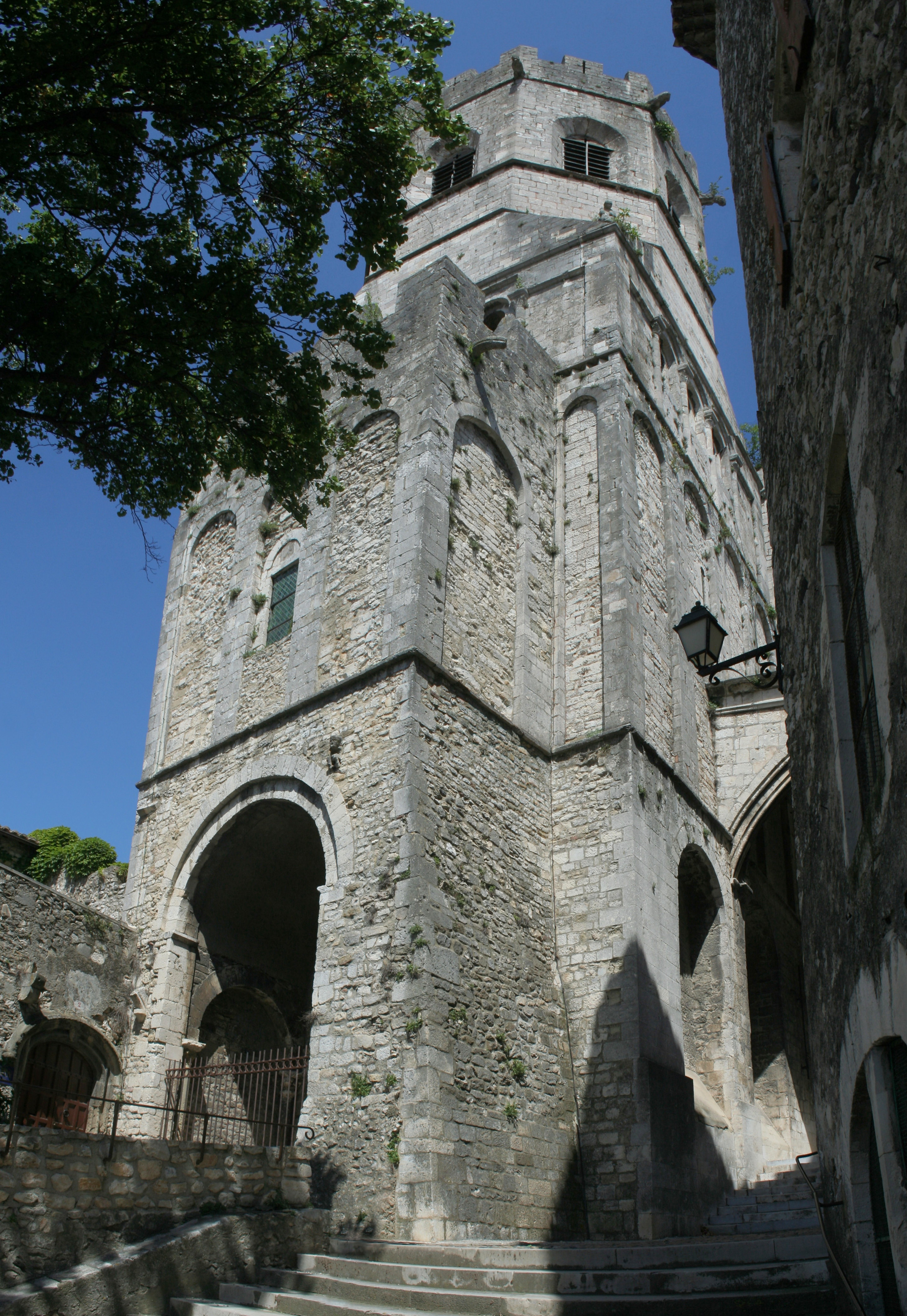
- Viviers Cathedral

Location
- Country: France
- Ecclesiastical province: Lyon
- Metropolitan: Archdiocese of Lyon

Statistics
- Area: 5,556 km^{2} (2,145 sq mi)
- Population: Total; Catholics: (as of 2022); 326,606 ▼; 284,000 (est.)
- Parishes: 23 'new parishes' ▼

Information
- Denomination: Roman Catholic
- Sui iuris church: Latin Church
- Rite: Roman Rite
- Established: 4th Century
- Cathedral: Cathedral of St. Vincent in Viviers, Ardèche
- Patron saint: Saint Vincent
- Secular priests: 79 (diocesan) ▼26 (Religious Orders) ▼20 Permanent Deacons

Current leadership
- Pope: Leo XIV
- Bishop: Hervé Giraud
- Metropolitan Archbishop: Olivier de Germay
- Bishops emeritus: François Blondel

Map

Website
- Website of the Diocese

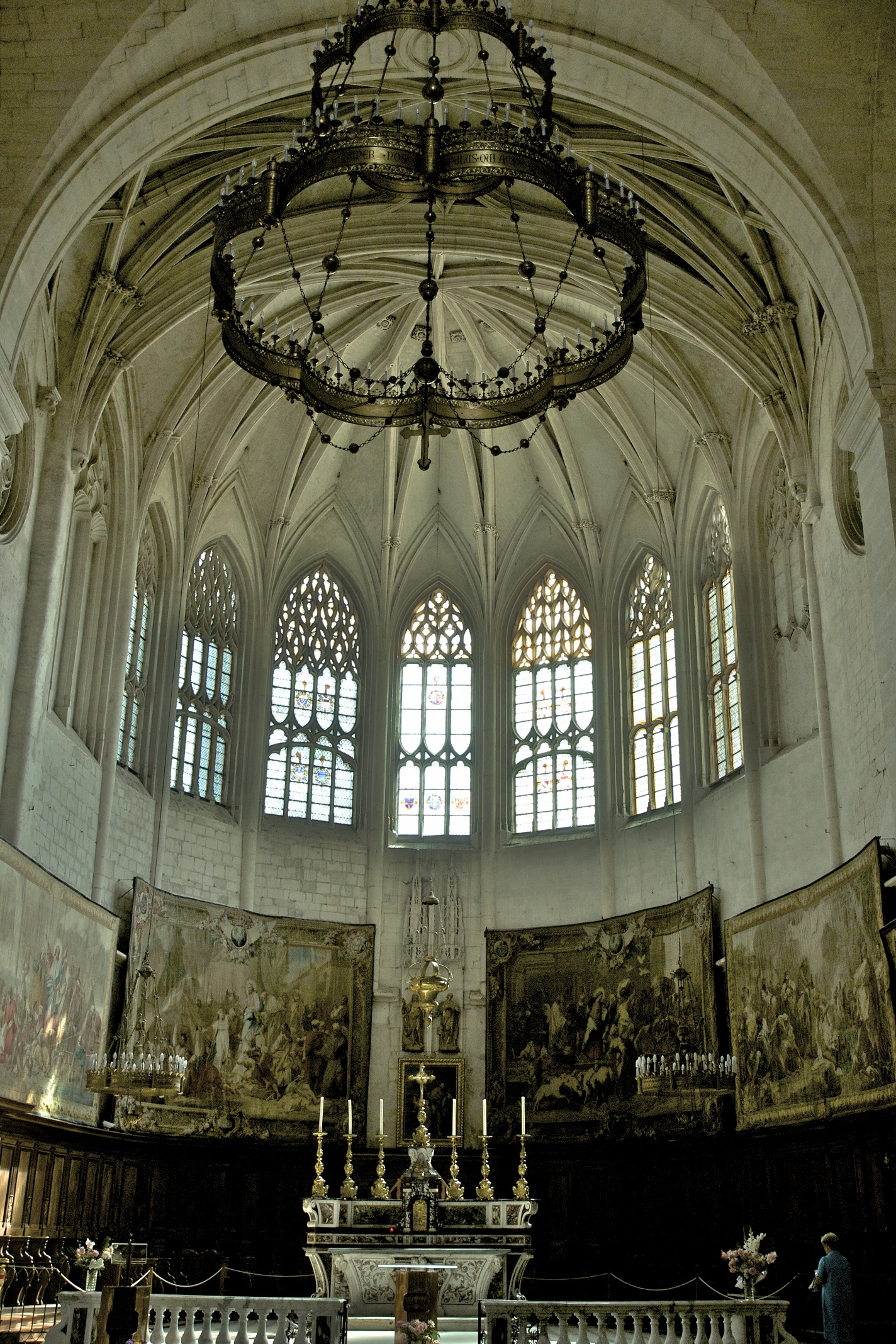
High altar of Viviers Cathedral

The Diocese of Viviers (Latin: Dioecesis Vivariensis; French: Diocèse de Viviers [djɔsɛz də vivje]) is a Latin Church diocese of the Catholic Church in France. Erected in the 4th century, the diocese was restored in the Concordat of 1822, and comprises the department of Ardèche, in the Region of Rhône-Alpes. It is a suffragan of the Archdiocese of Lyon. The city of Viviers is located on the west (left) bank of the Rhône River, just south of the confluence of the River L'Escoulay and the Rhône, about 52 km. north of Orange.

== History ==
Andeolus, a disciple and subdeacon of Polycarp of Smyrna (died 155), brought Christianity to the Vivarais under Emperor Septimius Severus (193–211), and was martyred in 208. This story is based on the hagiography of the Breverarium Lugdunensis. Andeolus and his companions also brought Christianity to Marseille and Lyon.

The "Old Chart" (Carta vetus), drawn up in 950 by Bishop Thomas, the most complete document concerning the primitive Church of Viviers, names five bishops who lived at Alba Augusta (modern Alba-la-Romaine): Januarius, Septimus, Maspicianus, Melanius and Avolus. The last was a victim of the invasion of Chrocus, rex Romanorum, the exact date of the destruction is unknown.

In consequence of the ravages suffered by Alba Augusta, the new bishop, Promotus, transferred the see to Viviers.

=== Metropolitan ===
It seems that the Diocese of Viviers was disputed for a long time by the metropolitan Sees of Vienne and Arles. From the eleventh century its dependence on Vienne was not contested. John II, cardinal and Bishop of Viviers (1073–1095), had the abbatial church of Cruas consecrated by Urban II and accompanied him to the Council of Clermont.

In the 17th century, the diocese of Viviers was a suffragan of the archbishop of Vienne. The population of the city alone was about 2,000 persons. In 2021 the population of Viviers was 3,674.

=== Suzerain ===
Afterwards, it is said that Conrad III gave Lower Vivaraisas to Bishop William (1147) as an independent suzerainty. In the thirteenth century, under the reign of King Louis IX of France, the Bishop of Viviers was obliged to recognize the jurisdiction of the Seneschal of Beaucaire.

By the treaty of 10 July 1305 Philip IV of France obliged the bishops of Viviers to admit the suzerainty of the kings of France over all their temporal domain.

=== Religious conflicts ===
Viviers was often troubled by religious conflicts: the Albigensian Crusade in the thirteenth century.

The first example of Protestant activity in the Vivarais was at Annonay, northwest of Viviers, in the mountains. In 1528, a former Franciscan named Étienne Machopolis, a doctor of theology, who had known Martin Luther in Saxony, began preaching in public against the cults of saints and other superstitions. He was driven out, but in the next year another ex-Franciscan, Étienne Rénier, who preached a similar policy, was arrested, taken to Vienne, and burned at the stake. By 1562, there were enough Protestants in Viviers that Noë Aubert, Seigneur de Saint-Alban, assembled a force of Huguenots in the Dauphiné, crossed the Rhône, and seized Viviers. The cathedral of Saint-Vincent was pillaged, the residences of the bishop and of the canons damaged, and the relics burnt. Viviers became a Protestant stronghold.

After the massacre of Huguenots at Vassy on 1 March 1562, led by the Catholic François, Duke of Guise, the Protestant Louis de Bourbon, Prince de Condé, abandoned the French court and met the Protestant lords at Orleans on 11 April 1562; the city of Viviers joined his party, along with Privas, Tournon, Annonay, Aubenas, and Villeneuve-de Berg. In November 1562, the reformers held an assembly in Nîmes, which they called the Estates of Languedoc; it was only a meeting of representatives of the cities, however, most of whom were Protestant, including Noël Aubert, who represented Viviers. They appointed the Comte de Crussol their chief and conservator of the country until the majority of King Charles IX of France, who was only twelve; and the Sieur de Cournonterral the governor of the Vivarais. In December 1562, the real Estates of Languedoc were summoned by Vicomte Guillaume de Joyeuse, royal lieutenant-general of Languedoc.

In February 1567, Noël Aubert made a second attack on Viviers, and ordered the cathedral to be pulled down and the episcopal palace, which had been built by Bishop Claude de Tournon (1499–1523) to be demolished.

The reign of Louis XIII witnessed the revolt of the Calvinists (1627–1629) against royal authority, which ended in the capture of Privas by the royal army; the Dragonnades under Louis XIV after the revocation of the Edict of Nantes; the war of the Camisards (1702–1710).

=== French Revolution ===
One of the first acts of the French Revolution was the abolition of feudalism and its institutions, including estates, provinces, duchies, baillies, and other obsolete organs of government. The National Constituent Assembly ordered their replacement by political subdivisions called "departments", to be characterized by a single administrative city in the center of a compact area. The decree was passed on 22 December 1789, the boundaries fixed on 26 February 1790, with the institution to be effective on 4 March 1790. A metropolitanate called "Metropole du Sud-est" was established, which consisted of nine departments, one of which was "Ardèche". It's administrative center was fixed at Viviers. The National Constituent Assembly then, on 6 February 1790, instructed its ecclesiastical committee to prepare a plan for the reorganization of the clergy. At the end of May, its work was presented as a draft Civil Constitution of the Clergy, which, after vigorous debate, was approved on 12 July 1790. There was to be one diocese in each department, requiring the suppression of approximately fifty dioceses, especially along the Rhône River. The new dioceses were grouped into ten "Metropoles", one of which was the "Metropole du Sud-Est," which contained both Rhône-et-Loire (with the metropolitan seated at Lyons) and Ardèche (Viviers). Both the establishment and the suppression of dioceses, however, was a canonical matter, and was reserved to the pope, not to the National Constituent Assembly.

==== Bishop de Savine ====
Charles de Savine had been bishop of Viviers since 1778. He was not elected by his clergy to the Estates General which met in Versailles in 1789. His liberal sympathies were demonstrated when he presided at a Mass at Viviers on the "Fête de la fédération" on 14 July 1790. Though he hesitated over approving of the Civil Constitution, he finally took the required oath, one of only four bishops who did. He then resigned his bishopric, and successfully stood for election as constitutional bishop of Ardèche. As a constitutional bishop, he proceeded to consecrate as bishops two of his vicars, and, in 1793, travelled with them to Grenoble to consecrate the constitutional bishop of Isère, Henri Reymond. On 1 December 1793, he resigned all his episcopal functions at the departmental assembly, and became a supporter of the Cult of Reason. Driven out of Viviers, he took refuge in Annonay, Tournon, and then Embrun, but eventually was captured, sent to Paris, and imprisoned. After the death of Robespierre he was freed, and found a job at the Arsenal library. In 1800, he made an effort to regain the bishopric of Viviers, but was firmly rebuffed by the clergy of the diocese, led by the Grand Vicar.

While Bishop de Savine was in schism and apostasy, the administration of the diocese of Viviers were entrusted to the archbishop of Vienne, Charles d'Aviau, by a special grant of powers by Pope Pius VI. With the permission of the archbishop, daily administration was placed in the hands of the Grand Vicar of Viviers, Régis Vernet.

=== Napoleon and restoration ===
On 9–10 November 1799, the Coup of 18 Brumaire resulted in the establishment of the French Consulate, with Napoleon as the First Consul. To advance his aggressive military foreign policy, he believed it necessary to make internal peace with the Catholic Church. Negotiations began immediately, and resulted in the Concordat of 1801 (July and August) with Pope Pius VII, which was highly favorable to Napoleon's interests. As under the ancien régime, the nomination to bishoprics belonged to the head of state, and the pope reserved the right to approve or reject the candidate.

The bishopric of Viviers and all the other dioceses in France were suppressed by Pius VII in the bull "Qui Christi Domini" of 29 November 1801. This removed all the contaminations and novelties introduced by the Constitutional Church. In the reestablishment of the ecclesiastical order, Vienne disappeared as a metropolitan archdiocese, and became a suffragan diocese of the archbishopric of Lyon. Viviers, a former suffragan of Vienne, is not mentioned.

The diocesan structure of France was re-established by Pope Pius VII on 27 July 1817, by the bull "Commissa divinitus". The diocese of Viviers was included in the ecclesiastical province of Vienne, which was returned to metropolitan status. The terms of the bull are re-enacted in the bull "Paternae Charitatis" of 6 October 1822. The diocese then included almost all the ancient Diocese of Viviers and some part of the ancient Diocese of Valence, Vienne, Le Puy and Uzès (see Nîmes). On 24 September 1821, in the bull "Novam de Galliarum," at the request of King Louis XVIII, Pope Pius VII assigned the new diocese of Viviers as a suffragan of the Archdiocese of Avignon. The first bishop, André Molin, was appointed by King Louis on 10 April 1823, and approved by the pope on 16 May 1823; he was consecrated a bishop on 6 July 1823 by the Archbishop of Paris, Hyacinthe-Louis de Quélen.

== Bishops ==
=== To 1000 ===
- Januarius
- Septimius
- Maspicianus
- Melanius
- c. 407–c. 411: Avolus
- c. 411–c. 431: Auxonius
- c. 452–c. 463: Promotus
- c. 486–c. 500: Lucianus
- c. 507: Valerianus
- c. 517–c. 537: Venantius
- Rusticus
- (attested 549) Melanius (II)
- Eucherius
- Firminus
- Aulus
- Eumachius
- c. 673: Longinus.
- Joannes I.
- Ardulfus
- c. 740: Arcontius
- Eribaldus
- c. 815: Thomas I.
- c. 833: Teugrinus
- c. 850: Celsus
- c. 851–874: Bernoin
- c. 875: Etherius (Ætherius)
- c. 892: Rostaing I
- c. 908: Richard
- c. 950: Thomas II
- c. 965–c. 970: Rostaing II
- c. 974: Arman I
- c. 993: Pierre

=== From 1000 to 1300 ===
- 1014–1041: Arman II.
- 1042–1070: Gérard
- 1073–1095: Giovanni di Toscanella.
- 1096–1119: Leodegarius
- 1119–1124: Hatto (Atton)
- 1125–1131: Pierre (I)
- 1133–1146: Josserand de Montaigu
- 1147–1155: Guillaume (I)
- 1157–1170: Raymond d'Uzès
- 1171–1173: Robert de La Tour du Pin
- 1174–1205: Nicolas
- 1205–1220: Bruno (Burnon)
- 1220–1222: Guillaume (II)
- 1222–1242: Bermond d'Anduze
- 1244–1254: Arnaud de Vogüé
- 1255–1263: Aimon de Genève
- 1263–1291: Hugues de La Tour du Pin
- 1292–1296: Guillaume de Falguières
- 1297–1306: Aldebert de Peyre

=== From 1300 to 1500 ===
- 1306–1318: Louis de Poitiers
- 1319–1322: Guillaume de Flavacourt
- 1322–1325: Pierre de Mortemart
- 1325–1326: Pierre de Moussy
- 1326–1330: Aymar de La Voulte
- 1331–1336: Henri de Thoire-Villars
- 1336–1365: Aymar de La Voulte (again)
- 1365–1373: Bertrand de Châteauneuf
- 1373–1375: Pierre de Sarcenas
- 1376–1383: Bernard d'Aigrefeuille
- 1383–1385: Jean Allarmet de Brogny (Avignon Obedience)
- 1385–1387: Olivier de Poitiers (Avignon Obedience).
- 1387–1388: Pietro Pileo di Prata (Avignon Obedience)
- 1389–1406: Guillaume de Poitiers (Avignon Obedience)
- 1406–1442: Jean de Linières (Avignon Obedience)
- 1442–1454: Guillaume-Olivier de Poitiers
- 1454–1477: Hélie de Pompadour
- 1477–1478: Giuliano della Rovere
- 1478–1497: Jean de Montchenu
- 1498–1542: Claude de Tournon

=== From 1500 to 1805 ===
- 1542–1550: Charles de Tournon
- 1550–1554: Simon de Maillé-Brézé
- 1554 : Alessandro Farnese Administrator
- 1554–1564: Jacques-Marie Sala
- 1564–1571: Eucher de Saint-Vital
- 1571–1572: Pierre d'Urre
- 1575–1621: Jean V. de L'Hôtel
- 1621–1690: Louis-François de la Baume de Suze
- 1692–1713: Antoine de La Garde de Chambonas
- 1713–1723: Martin de Ratabon
- [1723: Etienne-Joseph I. de La Fare-Monclar]
- 1723–1748: François-Renaud de Villeneuve
- 1748–1778: Joseph-Robin Morel de Mons
- 1778–1802: Charles de La Font de Savine

=== From 1802 ===
The diocese was suppressed from 1801 to 1823.

- 1823–1825: André Molin
- 1825–1841: Abbon-Pierre-François Bonnel de la Brageresse
- 1841–1857: Joseph Hippolyte Guibert
- 1857–1876: Louis Delcusy
- 1876–1923: Joseph-Michel-Frédéric Bonnet
- 1923–1930: Etienne-Joseph Hurault
- 1931–1937: Pierre-Marie Durieux
- 1937–1965: Alfred Couderc
- 1965–1992: Jean VI. Hermil
- 1992–1998: Jean Marie Louis Bonfils
- 1999–2015: François Marie Joseph Pascal Louis Blondel
- 2015–2023: Jean-Louis Marie Balsa
- 2024– : Hervé Giraud

== See also ==
- Viviers Cathedral

== Books ==
=== Reference works ===
- Gams, Pius Bonifatius (1873). Series episcoporum Ecclesiae catholicae: quotquot innotuerunt a beato Petro apostolo (in Latin). Ratisbon: Typis et Sumptibus Georgii Josephi Manz. (Use with caution; obsolete)
- Eubel, Conradus, ed. (1913). Hierarchia catholica (in Latin). Vol. 1 (second ed.). Münster: Libreria Regensbergiana.
- Eubel, Conradus, ed. (1914). Hierarchia catholica (in Latin). Vol. 2 (second ed.). Münster: Libreria Regensbergiana.
- Eubel, Conradus; Gulik, Guilelmus, eds. (1923). Hierarchia catholica (in Latin). Vol. 3 (second ed.). Münster: Libreria Regensbergiana.
- Gauchat, Patritius (Patrice) (1935). Hierarchia catholica (in Latin). Vol. IV (1592-1667). Münster: Libraria Regensbergiana.
- Ritzler, Remigius; Sefrin, Pirminus (1952). Hierarchia catholica medii et recentis aevi (in Latin). Vol. V (1667-1730). Patavii: Messagero di S. Antonio.
- Ritzler, Remigius; Sefrin, Pirminus (1958). Hierarchia catholica medii et recentis aevi. Vol. VI (1730-1799). Patavii: Messagero di S. Antonio.
- Ritzler, Remigius; Sefrin, Pirminus (1968). Hierarchia Catholica medii et recentioris aevi (in Latin). Vol. 7 (1800–1846). Monasterii: Libr. Regensburgiana.
- Remigius Ritzler; Pirminus Sefrin (1978). Hierarchia catholica Medii et recentioris aevi (in Latin). Vol. VIII (1846–1903). Il Messaggero di S. Antonio.
- Pięta, Zenon (2002). Hierarchia catholica medii et recentioris aevi (in Latin). Vol. IX (1903–1922). Padua: Messagero di San Antonio. ISBN 978-88-250-1000-8.

=== Studies ===
- Arnaud, Eugène (1888). Histoire des protestants du Vivarais et du Velay: pays de Languedoc, de la Réforme à la Révolution. (in French). Volume 1. Paris: Grassart, 1888.
- Babey, Pierre (1956). Le pouvoir temporel de l'évêque de Viviers au Moyen Âge, 815-1452. [Thèse soutenue devant la Faculté de droit de l'Université de Lyon pour le Doctorat de droit romain et d'histoire du droit]. (in French) Lyon: Bosq 1956.
- Du Boys, Albert (1842). Album du Vivarais, ou itinéraire historique et descriptif de cette ancienne province (in French). Grenoble: Prudhomme.
- Duchesne, Louis (1907). Fastes épiscopaux de l'ancienne Gaule (in French). Vol. Tome I: Provinces du Sud-Est (deuxieme ed.). Paris: A. Fontemoing. pp. 235–239.
- Jean, Armand (1891). Les évêques et les archevêques de France depuis 1682 jusqu'à 1801 (in French). Paris: A. Picard. pp. 486–489.
- Le Sourd, Auguste (1926). Essai sur les Ētats de Vivarais depuis leurs origines. (in French). Paris: Société générale d'imprimerie et d'édition, 1926.
- Mollier, P. H. (1908). La cathédrale de Viviers (in French). Privas: Impr. Centr. de l'Ardéche.
- Pisani, Paul (1907). Répertoire biographique de l'épiscopat constitutionnel (1791-1802) (in French). Paris: A. Picard et fils.
- Roche, Auguste (1891). Armorial généalogique & biographique des évêques de Viviers (in French). Vol. I. Lyon: M.L. Brun. Tome II. 1894.
- Sainte-Marthe, Denis de; Haureau, Bartholomaeus (1865). Gallia christiana, in provincias ecclesiasticas distributa (in Latin). Vol. 16 (Tomus sextus decimus). Paris: Apud V. Palme. pp. 538–610, Instrumenta, pp. 219–288.

=== External links ===
- (in French) Centre national des Archives de l'Église de France, L’Épiscopat francais depuis 1919, retrieved: 2016-12-24.
