= Venantius of Viviers =

French Roman Catholic saint

Venant de Viviers
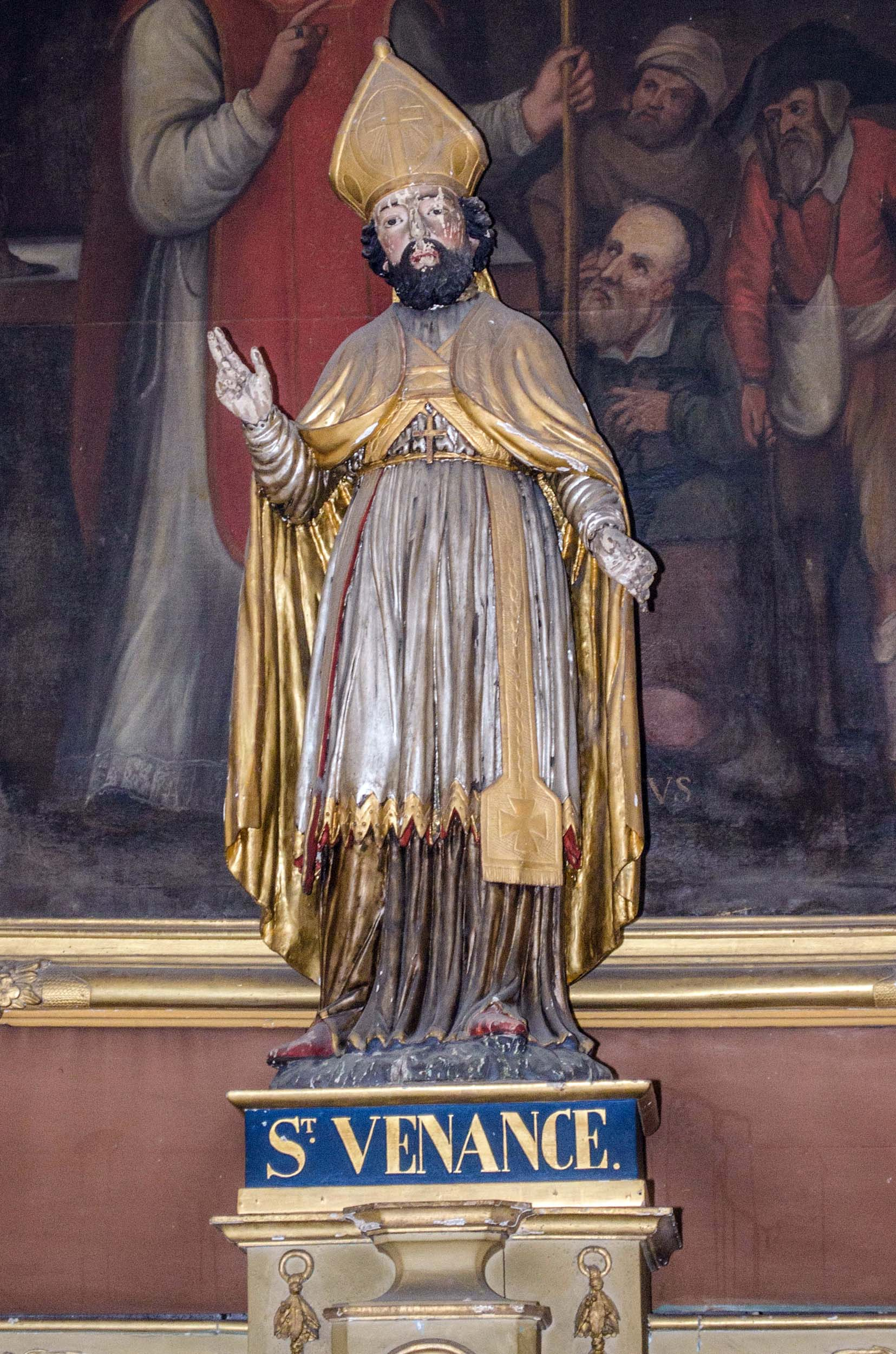
- Statue of Venant de Viviers, chapelle des Capucins, in Valence.

Pilgrim
- Died: 544

Venantius (French: Venant, Venance; died 544) was the Bishop of Viviers in the Ardèche. He became a Roman Catholic Saint.
