= Jean Hermil =

French clergyman

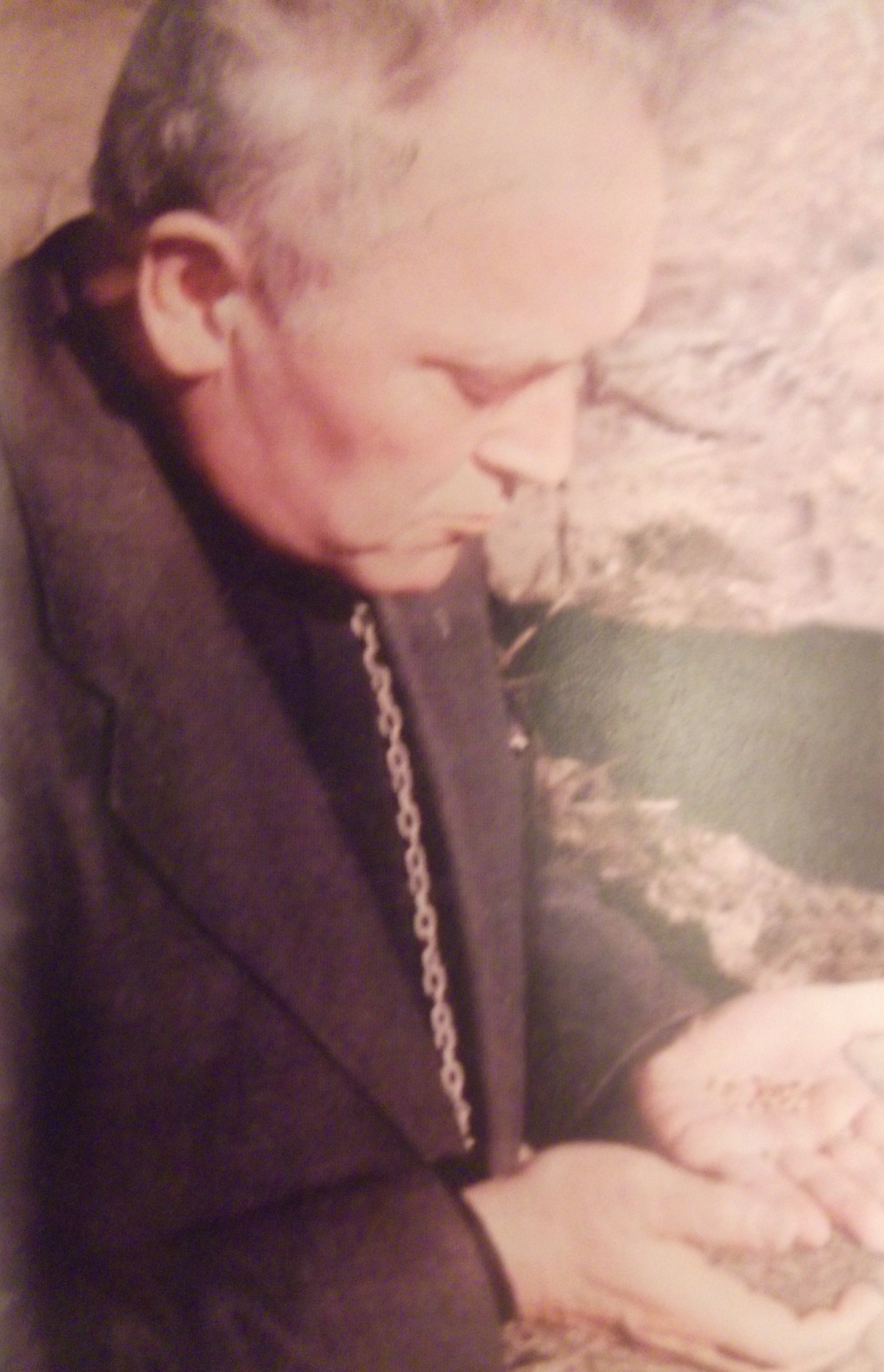

Jean Hermil (24 September 1917 – 10 March 2006) was a French prelate of the Catholic Church bishop of Viviers from 1965 to 1992, following a year and a half as auxiliary bishop of Autun.

Jean Hermil was born on 24 December 1917 in Charolles. He was ordained a priest on 5 July 1942 at Autun.

On 15 May 1963, Pope John XXIII appointed him auxiliary bishop of Autun and titular bishop of Marida. He received his episcopal consecration on 2 July from Lucien-Sidroine Lebrun, Bishop of Autun.

On 14 December 1965, Pope John named him bishop of Viviers. Pope John Paul II accepted his resignation on 15 October 1992.

He died on 10 March 2006 in Viviers.

== Additional sources ==
- "Jean Hermil". Diocese of Autun. Archived from the original on 22 April 2021.
