= Avunculate =

Family relationship

The avunculate, sometimes called avunculism or avuncularism, is any social institution where a special relationship exists between an uncle and his sisters' children. This relationship can be formal or informal, depending on the society. Early anthropological research focused on the association between the avunculate and matrilineal descent, while later research has expanded to consider the avunculate in general society.

== Definition ==
The term avunculate comes from the Latin avunculus, the maternal uncle.

The 1989 Oxford English Dictionary defines "avunculate" as follows:

"Avunculate. The special relationship existing in some societies between a maternal uncle and his sister's son; maternal uncles regarded as a collective body.

1920 R. H. LOWIE Prim. Soc. v. 81 Ethnologists describe under the heading of avunculate the customs regulating in an altogether special way the relations of a nephew to his maternal uncle. Ibid. vii. 171 The Omaha are patrilineal now, but their having the avunculate proves that they once traced descent through the mother, for on no other hypothesis can such a usage be explained. ... "

== Avunculocal societies ==
An avunculocal society is one in which a married couple traditionally lives with the man's mother's eldest brother, which most often occurs in matrilineal societies. The anthropological term "avunculocal residence" refers to this convention, which has been identified in about 4% of the world's societies.

This pattern generally occurs when a man obtains his status, his job role, or his privileges from their nearest elder matrilineal male relative. When a woman's son lives near her brother, he is able to more easily learn how he needs to behave in the matrilineal role he has inherited.

=== Cultures with a formal avunculate ===
According to the Kazakh common law, the avunculate nephews could take anything from the relatives of the mother up to three times. In the Kyrgyz past a nephew, at a feast at his maternal uncle or grandfather, could take any horse from their herd or any delicacy.

In the Southwest United States, the Apache tribe practices a form of this, where the uncle is responsible for teaching the children social values and proper behavior while inheritance and ancestry is reckoned through the mother's family alone. Modern day influences have somewhat but not completely erased this tradition.

The Chamorros of the Mariana Islands and the Taíno of Turks and Caicos Islands are examples of societies that have practiced avunculocal residence.

== Anthropology research ==
Research on the avunculate in the early 20th century focused on the association between the avunculate and patrilineal/matrilineal societies. Franz Boas categorized various avunculate arrangements based on the location of residence in 1922. Henri Alexandre Juno made the claim that the avunculate in the Tsonga indicated that society had previously been matrilineal. Alfred Radcliffe-Brown identified the Tsonga (BaThonga) of Mozambique, the Tongans of the Pacific, and the Nama of Namibia as avunculate societies as early as 1924. He also expanded the concept to incorporate other family relationships.

Later research moved beyond the issue of matrilinealism. Claude Lévi-Strauss incorporated the avunculate into his "atom of kinship". Jan N. Bremmer argued based on a survey of the Indo-European peoples that the avunculate is explained by the principle of education outside the (extended) family, and does not indicate matrilinealism.

== Avunculate marriage ==
In historical (not anthropological) terminology, an avunculate marriage is the marriage of a man with the daughter of his sister (not explicitly forbidden by the listings in Leviticus 18). In most cultures with avunculate customs in the sense used by anthropologists, such a marriage would violate incest taboos governing relations between members of the same matrilineal lineage.
