= Bermond d'Anduze (bishop of Sisteron) =

- Bishop of Sisteron
- Elected: July 1174

Personal details
- Died: June 11, 1214
- Denomination: Roman Catholic
- Parents: Bernard-Bermond Anduze and Garsinde

Bermond Anduze (born, unknown — June 11, 1214) was an important Catholic cleric and bishop in 12th century France.

== Biography ==
Bermond Anduze was the son of Bernard-Bermond Anduze and Garsinde. After his appointment as a Canon, he was elected bishop of Sisteron in July 1174. He ran a trade with the Templars, on the Church of Our Lady of Olon. In March 1179, Bermond went to Rome and served on the Council of Lateran. In 1183, in accordance with the decision taken by the Archbishop of Moutiers-Tarentaise and the Bishop of Valencia, he obliged the monks of the Lure Abbey to leave the Cistercian order and adopt the rule of the Congregation of Chalais. In 1209, he attended the Council of Saint-Gilles, where Raymond VI of Toulouse, and Pierre Bermond of Anduze, his great-nephew, passed under the yoke of the papal legate Milon.

Two years later, on February 18, 1211, he was in Manosque, where he saw the Papal legate and Bishop Thédise of Agde assigned as the New consulate to the Malta Commander.

Bermond Anduze died June 11, 1214.

== See also ==
- Catholic Church in France
