= Arcy-sur-Cure =

- Commune
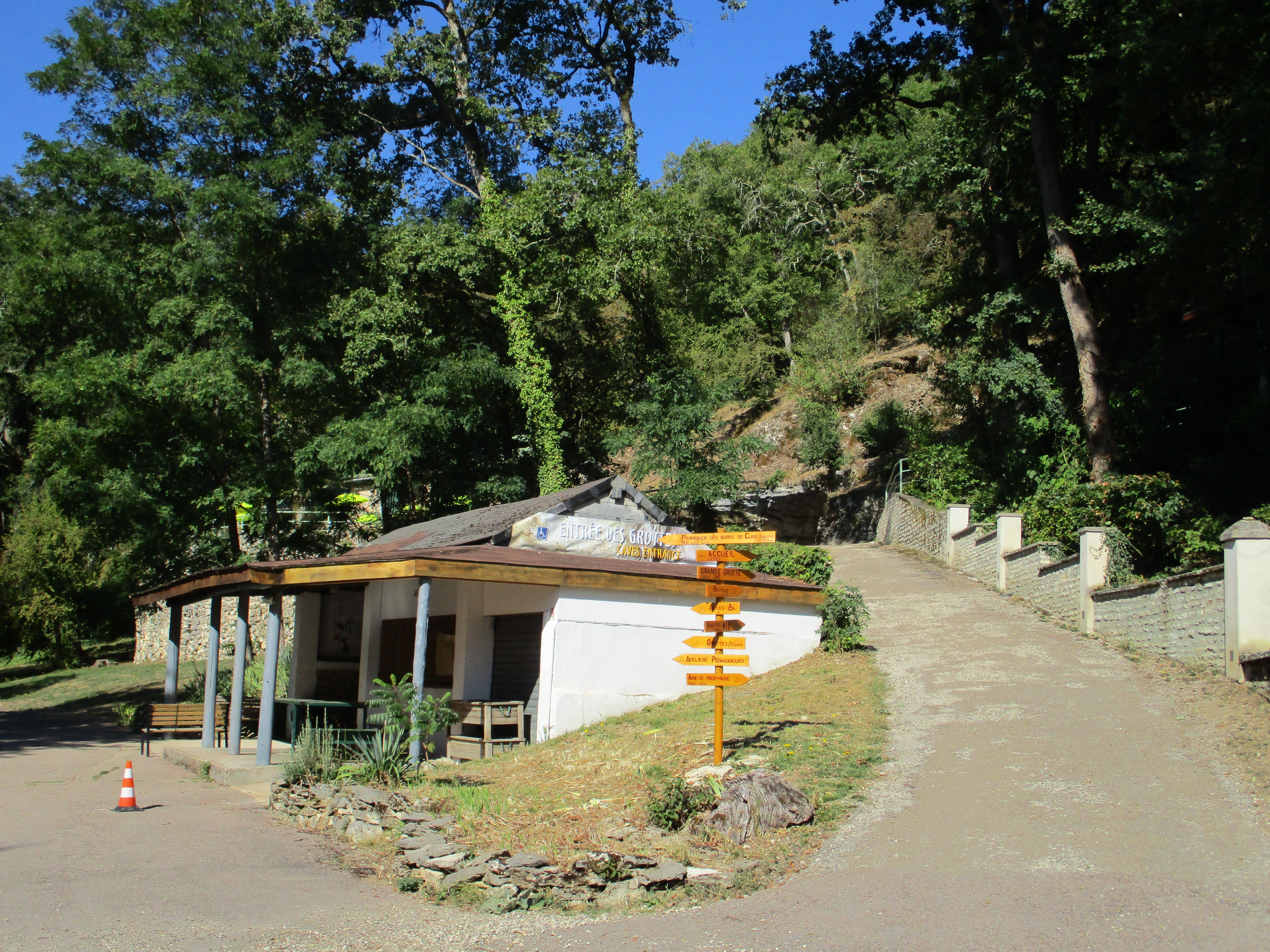
- The cave exit building in Arcy-sur-Cure
- Location of Arcy-sur-Cure
- Location within France Location within Bourgogne-Franche-Comté
- Coordinates: 47°36′14″N 3°45′41″E
- Country: France
- Region: Bourgogne-Franche-Comté
- Department: Yonne
- Arrondissement: Avallon
- Canton: Joux-la-Ville

Government
  - Mayor (2020–2026): Olivier Bertrand
- Area^{1}: 26.33 km^{2} (10.17 sq mi)
- Highest elevation: 301 m (988 ft)
- Lowest elevation: 121 m (397 ft)
- Population (2023): 486
  - Density: 18.5/km^{2} (47.8/sq mi)
- Time zone: UTC+01:00 (CET)
  - Summer (DST): UTC+02:00 (CEST)
- INSEE/Postal code: 89015 /89270
- ^{1} French Land Register data, which excludes lakes, ponds, glaciers > 1 km^{2} (0.386 sq mi or 247 acres) and river estuaries.

Arcy-sur-Cure (French pronunciation: [aʁsi syʁ kyʁ], literally Arcy on Cure) is a commune in the Yonne department in Bourgogne-Franche-Comté in north-central France.

The caves of Arcy-sur-Cure, just south of the commune, hold the second-oldest cave paintings known, after those of Chauvet Cave. Archeological remains at the Grotte du Renne were taken to provide evidence that Neanderthals had modern human behavior, but this is now doubted.

== See also ==
- Communes of the Yonne department
