= Caverne du Pont-d'Arc =

Replica of the Chauvet Cave in France

- Location: Vallon-Pont-d'Arc, Ardèche, Rhône-Alpes, France
- Coordinates: 44.406944°N 4.428056°E
- Designer: Xavier Fabre
- Type: Decorated cave, art gallery, tourist attraction
- Beginning date: 2012
- Opening date: 2015

The Caverne du Pont-d'Arc, Chauvet 2, is a replica of the Chauvet Cave in the commune of Vallon-Pont-d'Arc, in the department of Ardèche and in the Rhône-Alpes region of France. Construction began in October 2012 and it was opened to the public in 2015.

== Description ==
VOA report about the Chauvet Cave and its replica

The creation of the Caverne du Pont-d'Arc is a project which is cultural, scientific and technological, unique in its design and in its size (3,500 m^{2} (38,000 sq ft) on the ground and 8,180 m^{2} (88,000 sq ft) of geological facies - floors, walls and ceilings) making it the largest decorated replica cavern in the world.

== Access and Admission ==
Visits to the replica of the cave are only possible in guided groups. Time-bound tickets are sold for this purpose. Groups of about 25 people are admitted at intervals and complete the guided tour in French, English, German or Dutch in about 50 minutes. Audio guides in 10 languages are available for visitors speaking other languages.

Visitors can enter all other facilities of the complex free of charge.
