= Dominique Baffier =

French archaeologist and prehistorian

Dominique Baffier is a French archaeologist and prehistorian who specialises in Paleolithic cave paintings, or parietal art. She is known for her work at the Arcy-sur-Cure cave complex and for her subsequent role as curator of the Chauvet Cave from 2000 to 2014.

== Biography ==
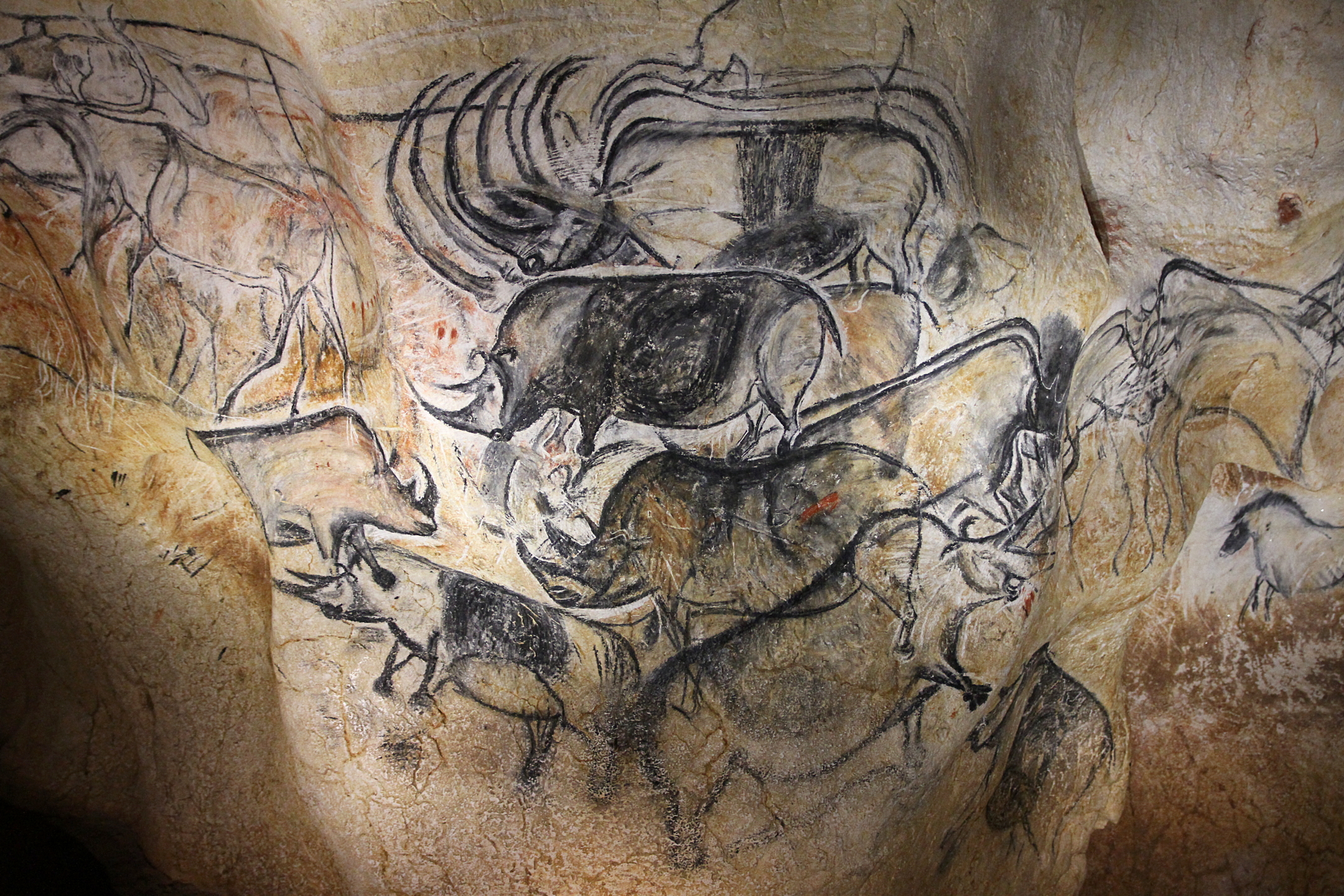
Replica of rhinoceros paintings in the Chauvet Cave.

She trained at the École du Louvre and the Sorbonne, where she studied under André Leroi-Gourhan. She joined the French National Centre for Scientific Research (CNRS) in 1973 and participated in the excavations at the Magdalenian site at Pincevent.

From the early 1990s Baffier was part of the team working at the Arcy-sur-Cure caves where she studied the paintings discovered in 1990 in the Great Cave (la Grande Grotte). Next she joined the scientific team led by Jean Clottes, which studied the Chauvet Cave, sometimes known as the Pont d'Arc cave. In 2000 she was seconded from CNRS to the Ministry of Culture and appointed curator at Chauvet. Her remit was to manage the cave interior while liaising with the CNRS laboratory at Moulis and with the national laboratory for research on historic monuments (LRMH), to ensure the safe preservation of the paintings by maintaining stable conditions within the cave, to authorise access for visitors, to maintain relationships with institutional partners and to communicate with the wider public. She was succeeded in January 2014 by Marie Bardisa.

She is an officer of the French Order of Merit and was awarded a gold medal by the Minister for Youth and Sports.

== Works ==
Her publications include:

- Les cavernes d'Arcy-sur-Cure, (with Michel Girard) Paris, La Maison des roches, 1998, 120 p., ill. ISBN 2-912691-02-8
- Les derniers Néandertaliens : le châtelperronien, Paris, La Maison des roches, 1999. ISBN 2-912691-04-4
- Préhistoire : les grottes peintes, Toulouse, Le Pérégrinateur, [2000]. ISBN 2-910352-27-7

== See also ==
- Caves of Arcy-sur-Cure
- Chauvet Cave
