= Baffier =

Baffier is a surname. Notable people with the surname include:

- Dominique Baffier, French archaeologist and prehistorian
- Jean Baffier (1851–1920), French sculptor
