= Gorges de l'Ardèche =

French valley

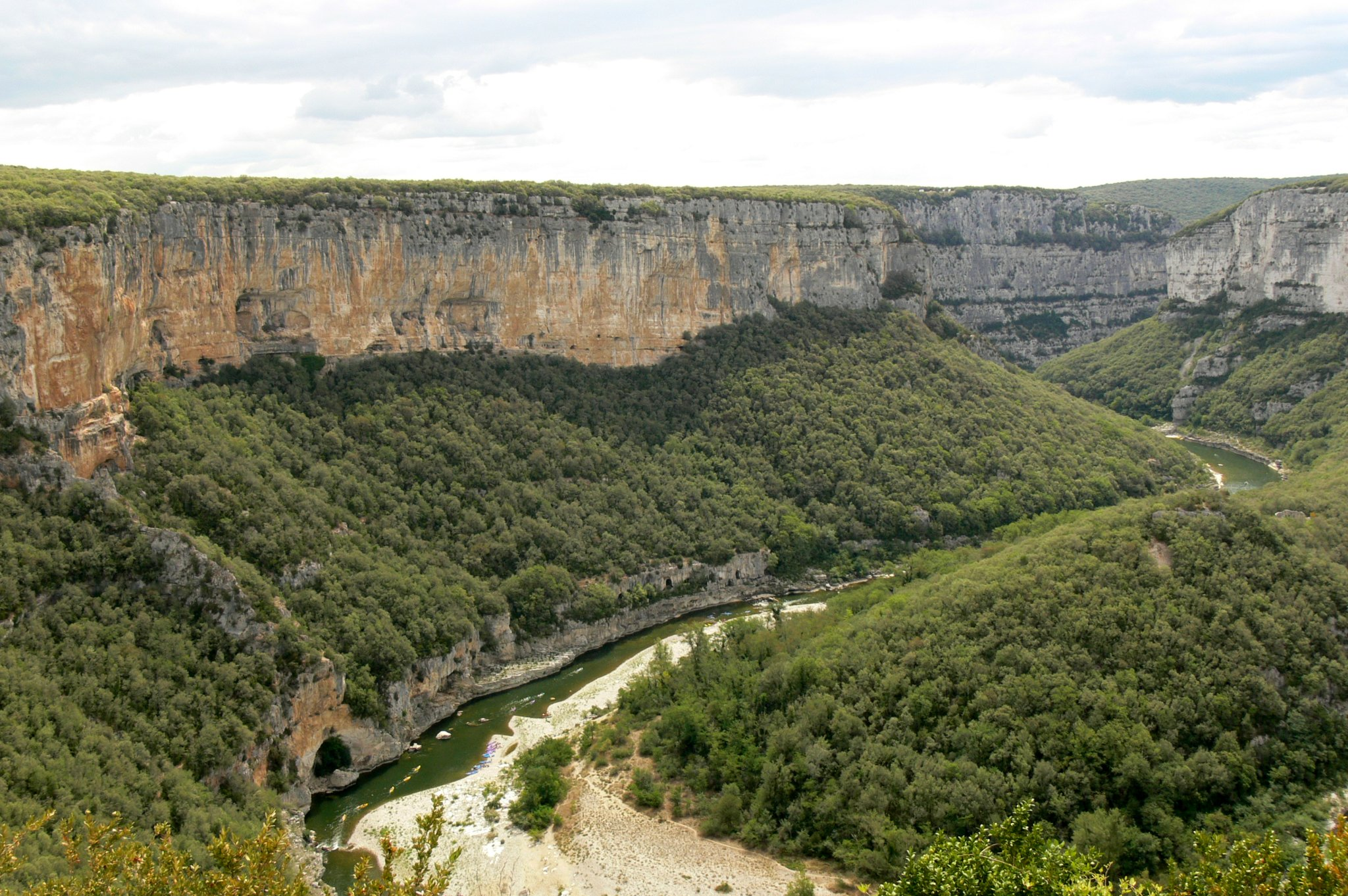
- View of Gorges de l'Ardèche, not far from cirque de la Madeleine

- Location within Auvergne-Rhône-Alpes Location within Occitanie Location within France
- Length: 30 km (19 mi)

Naming
- English translation: Gorges on River Ardèche

Geography
- Location: France
- Country: France
- State: Gard and Ardèche
- Region: Auvergne-Rhône-Alpes and Occitanie
- Coordinates: 44.363°N 4.449°E
- River: Ardèche
- Interactive map of Gorges de l'Ardèche

The Gorges de l'Ardèche is made up of a series of gorges in the river and locally known as the "European Grand Canyon", Located in the Ardèche, in the French department Ardèche, forming a thirty-kilometre long canyon running from Vallon-Pont-d'Arc to Saint-Martin-d'Ardèche. The lower part of the gorge forms the boundary between the Ardèche department and the Gard department. The canyon is a tourist attraction, drawing over a million visitors per year, in addition to a rich historical and archeological site.

Most of the canyon is protected; it is governed by the Réserve Naturelle Gorges de l'Ardèche. Notable sights along the canyon include the Pont d'Arc at the beginning of the canyon, a natural arch 60 m wide and 54 m high. Much of the canyon is inaccessible except by water, and canoeing and kayaking are popular sports on the river. Overnight camping is not allowed, except for at two bivouac shelters.

The cliffs offer habitat to rare birds such as the Bonelli's eagle. (As of 2013 there were only two pairs in the Ardèche, and no more than thirty in all of France.)

Humans have lived in caves in the area for over 300,000 years. Over 2,000 caves are found in the gorge, some of them painted; the best-known painted cave in the gorge is the Chauvet Cave.
