= Pont d'Arc =

Geological formation in France

Coordinates: 44°22′55″N 4°25′00″E

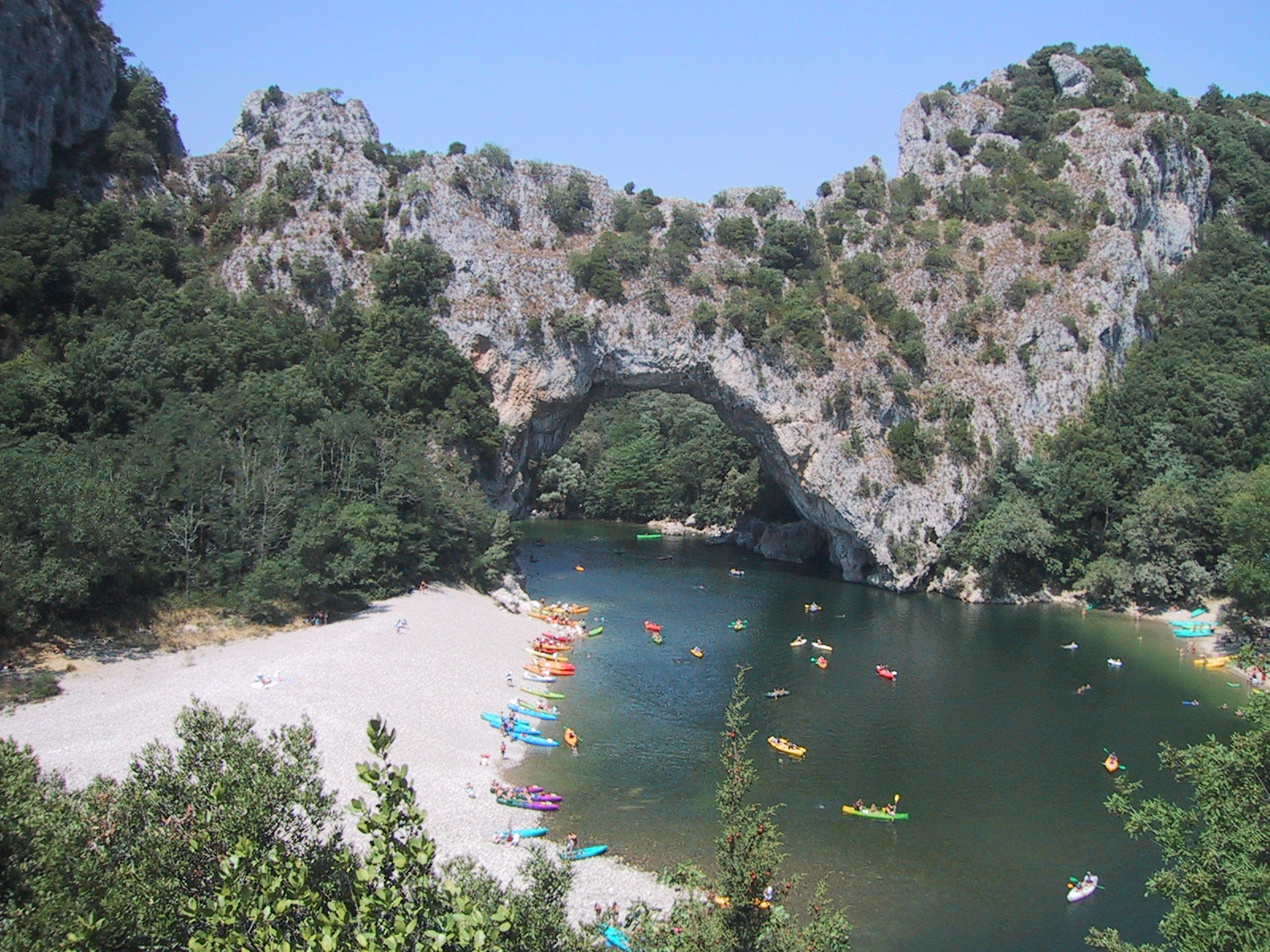
The Pont d'Arc

The Pont d'Arc (French pont = bridge) is a large natural bridge, located in the Ardèche département in the south of France, 5 km from the town of Vallon-Pont-d'Arc. This site is a popular destination in the Gorges de l'Ardèche Natural Reserve, and has been classified as a protected natural site since January 24th 1931.

== Description ==
The natural arch, formed when the river Ardèche broke through a narrow escarpment between its meander, is 59 metres (194 ft) wide and 34 m (112 ft) high at the top of the opening. It is nicknamed the "Gateway to the Gorges de l'Ardèche". The Pont d'Arc is the only stone arch that overhangs an active river.

In the near vicinity of the arch is the Chauvet-Pont-d'Arc Cave, containing one of the earliest known Paleolithic cave paintings, about 30,000 years old (featured in the 2010 documentary Cave of Forgotten Dreams by film director Werner Herzog). It is a very popular canoeing and kayaking area and is heavily visited by tourists.

== Geology ==
The Pont d'Arc natural arch formed about 124,000 years ago due to the slow-acting karst erosion of the limestone bedrock. Water from the river Ardèche progressively carved an immense opening in the rock and the river changed course, abandoning the original riverbed (this original meander is preserved in the nearby site known as the Combe d'Arc. In other words, the river Ardèche gradually eroded the limestone and created the immense opening seen at the Arc.

Arches like the Pont d'Arc are normally destined to disappear naturally due to erosion over thousands or millions of years. Other arches may form due to future meanders of the river Ardèche.

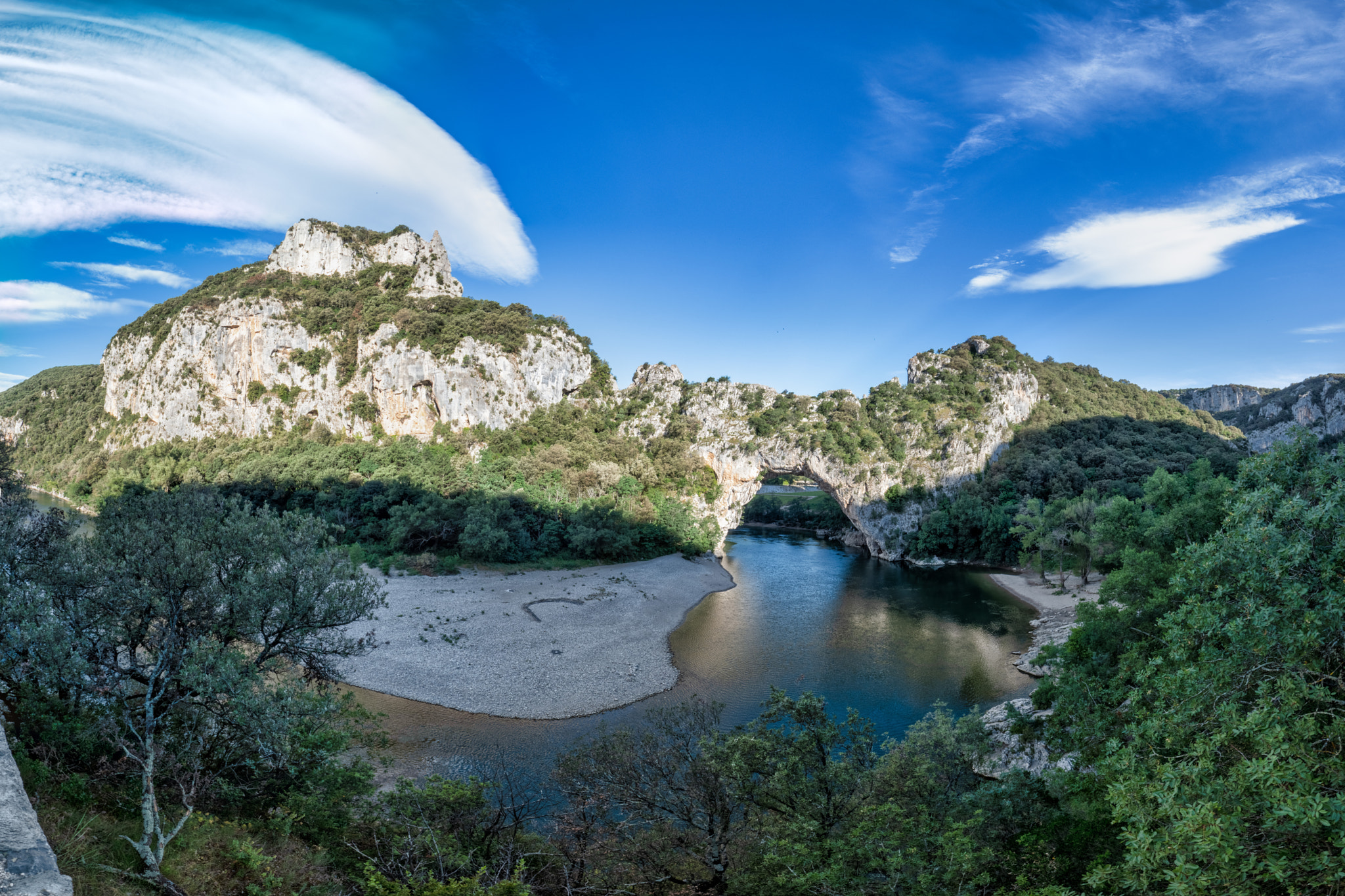

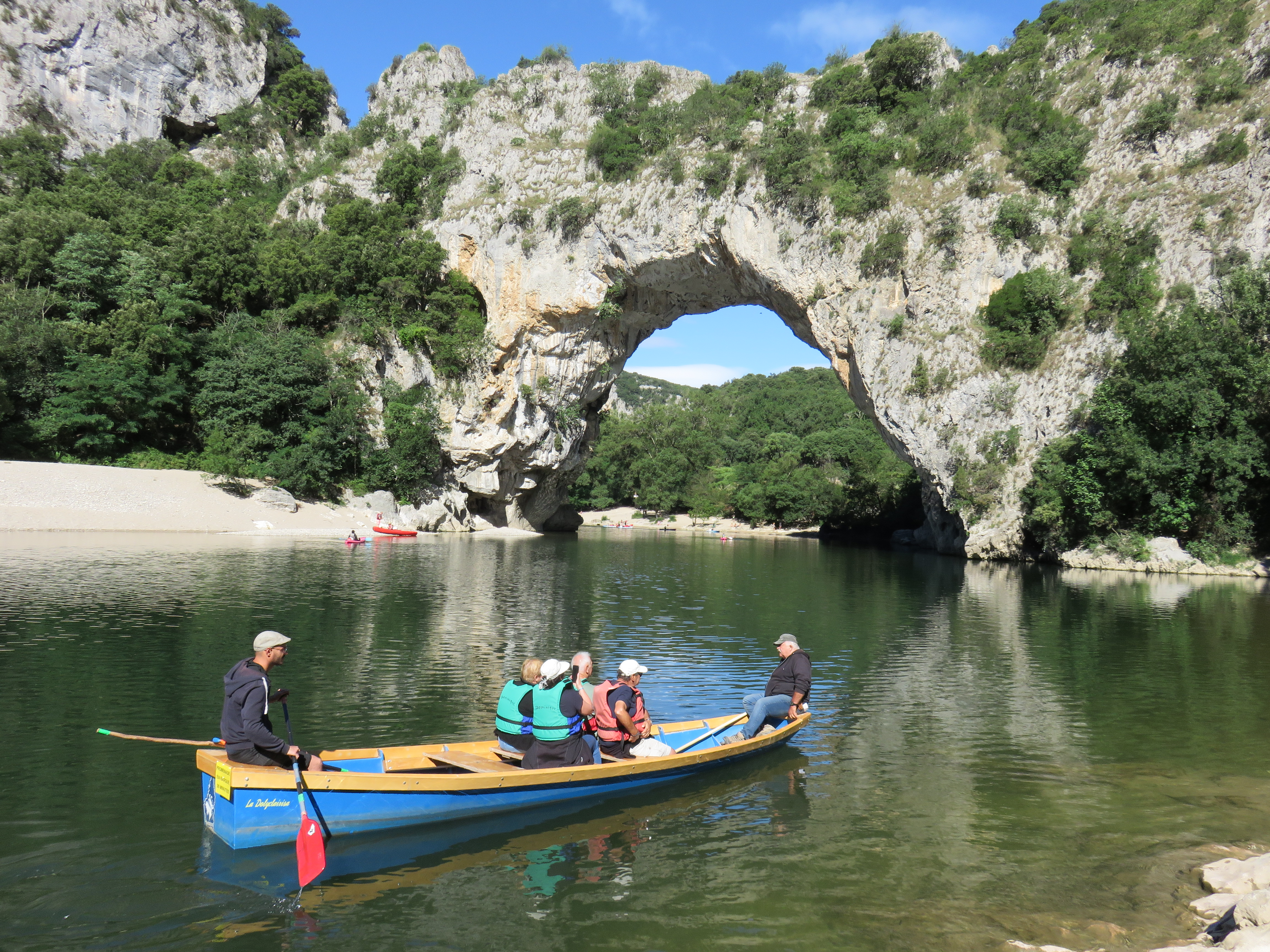

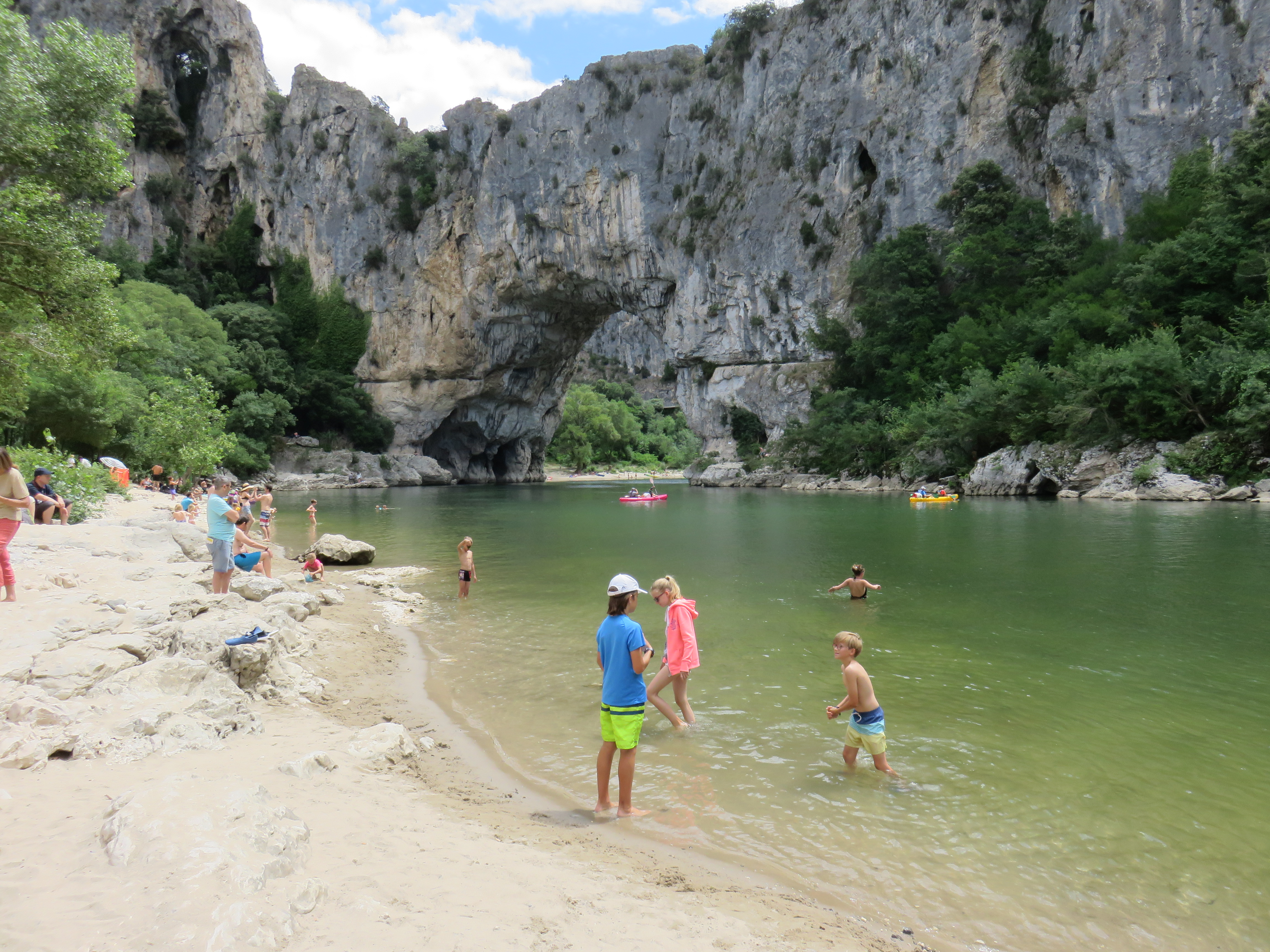

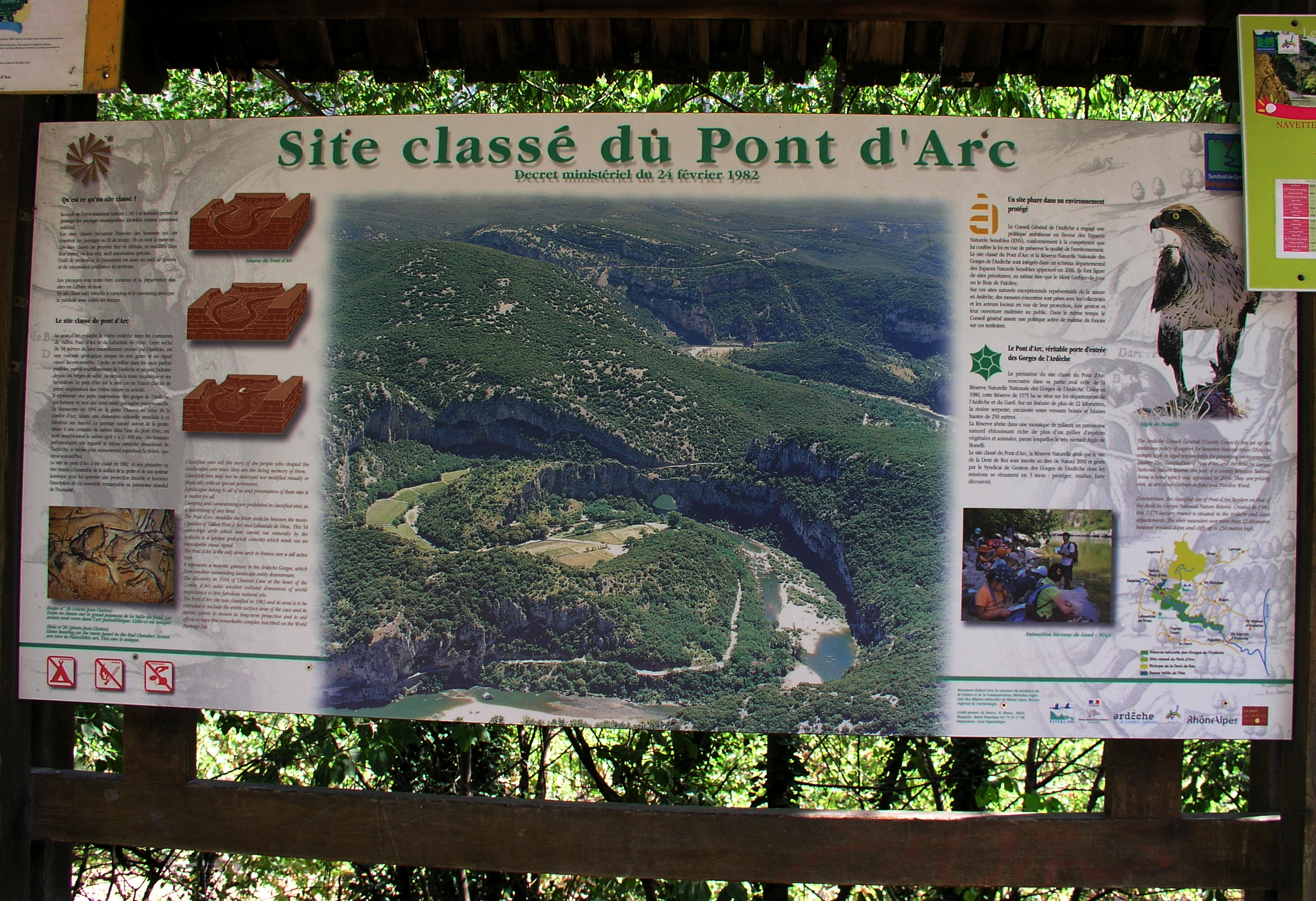

== See also ==
- Chauvet Cave
