= Caves of Arcy-sur-Cure =

Cave with prehistoric art in France

- (in French) fr:Grottes d'Arcy-sur-Cure
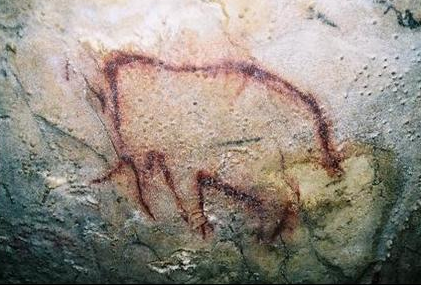
- Mammoth in Arcy-sur-Cure

- Location within France
- Location: Arcy-sur-Cure, Yonne, Burgundy, France
- Coordinates: 47°35′30″N 3°45′59″E
- Discovery: ancient
- Geology: Jurassic limestone
- Features: Decorated caves. Listed Heritage Monument (1992)
- Website: http://www.grottes-arcy.net/

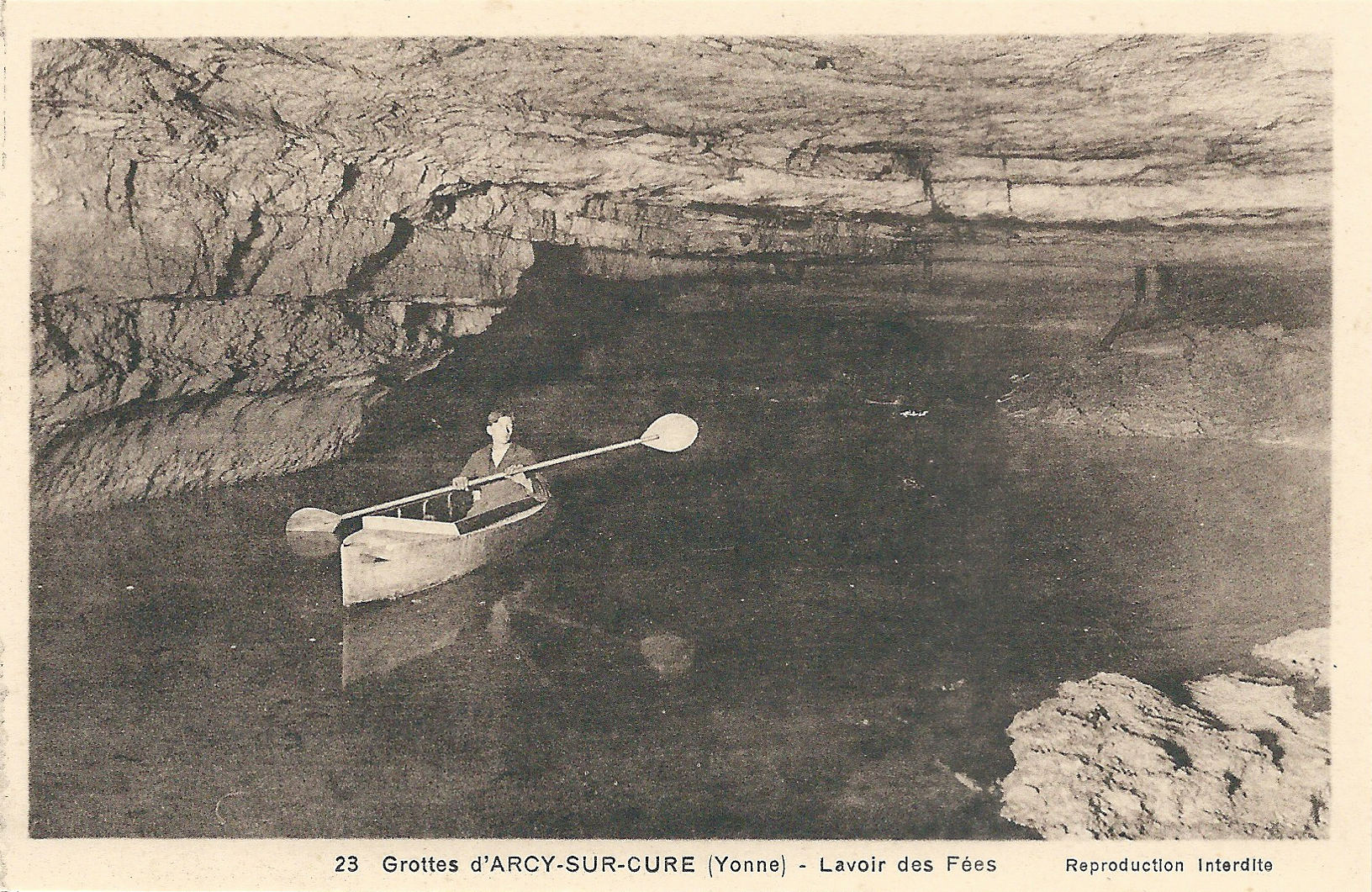
Lake in the Fairies cave - old postcard

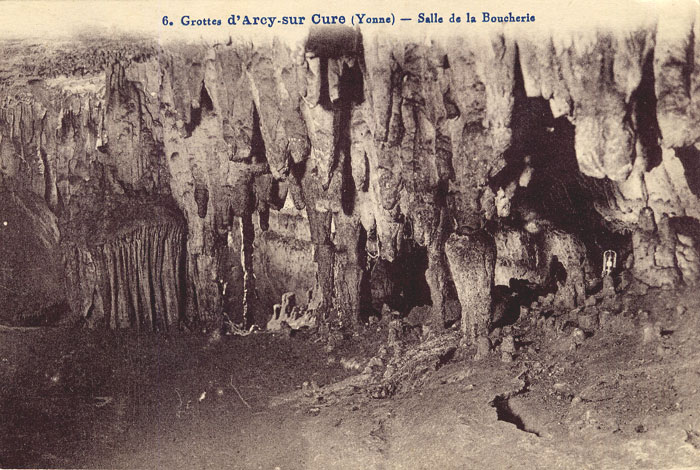
"Salle de la Boucherie" - old postcard

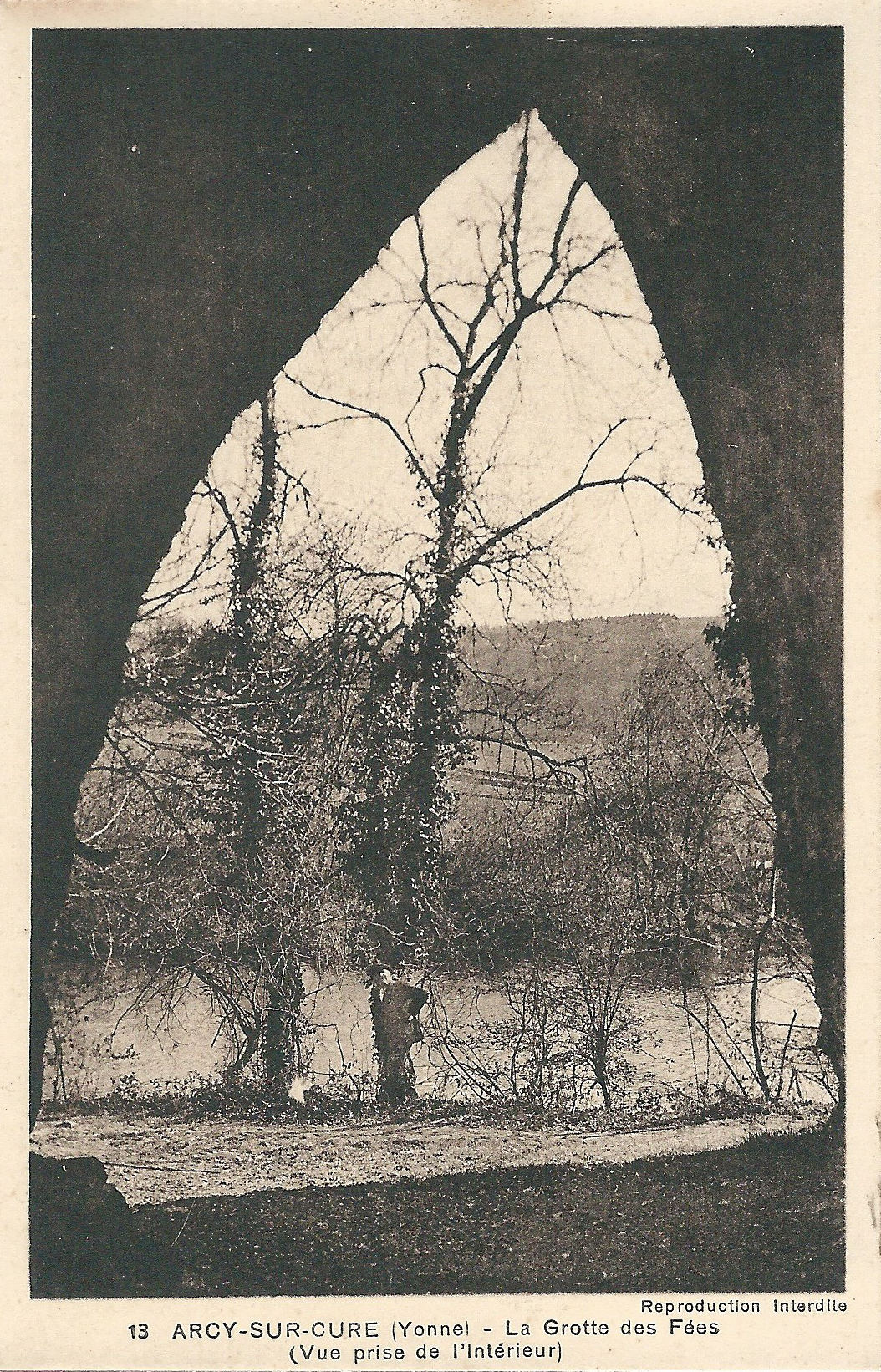
View from the entrance of the Fairies cave - old postcard

The caves of Arcy-sur-Cure are a series of caves located on the commune of Arcy-sur-Cure, Burgundy, France. Some of them contained archaeological artefacts, from the Mousterian to Gallo-Roman times.

Some hold remarkable parietal art, the second oldest presently known after those of the Chauvet Cave. Another notable characteristic of these caves is the time-long series of pollen, related to determined and consistent archaeological levels.

Between 1947 and 1963, they were searched by the French prehistorians Arlette and André Leroi-Gourhan. Listed monument historique (Heritage Monument) in 1992, they are partially open to the public.

== Location and description ==
Arcy-sur-Cure is 30 km (19 mi) south-east of Auxerre, in the Yonne departement. The caves are 1.3 km (0.81 mi) south of Arcy-sur-Cure, on the left bank of the river Cure. At this place the river has meandered through the coral limestone substrate, creating a valley bordered by crests standing 125 m (410 ft) up from the present river bed. The caves are in a meander and on the outer side of it where the flow is at its strongest. Most of them are south-orientated, with the most western ones slightly turned towards the south-east. At that place the erosional valley shows very steep sides, in some parts akin to cliffs. (Note: The scale (1/17000) of the Geoportail maps (1/17000) can be modified by zooming in or out. Aerial photography and geology maps available in the Catalogue de données panel tab on the left hand-side of the map (Aerial photography layer is in Catalogue de données tab, Données de base sub-menu, Photographies aériennes 9th entry down; geology map layer: Catalogue de données tab, Données de base sub-menu, Carte géologique 3rd entry down). Many other different layers can be added via the catalogue de données menu.) Several caves are distributed along some 800 m (2,600 ft) of the valley's side, at various levels.

Following its inhabitants from the Lower Palaeolithic culture in the Pleistocene era, the caves have sheltered Neanderthals from the Middle Palaeolithic (Mousterian and Châtelperronian); those have left behind them circular huts supported by mammoth tusks. Modern humans followed, with Aurignacians, Gravettians, Proto-Solutreans and Magdalenians. All in all the caves were inhabited up to the Middle Ages.

They are privately owned by Mr. Gabriel de la Varende, who allows and has actively supported archaeologic research from the beginning.

Originally open at both ends, collapsing ground closed one of the caves when the underground water flow sharply diminished. This cave now ends with basins at ground level formed by limestone deposits left by the water.

There are several lakes.

=== List of caves and shelters ===
Fifteen cavities at various altitudes and of various locations, sizes and contents, are grouped in that bend of the river:

- Great cave
- Lagopède shelter
- Horse cave, about 60 m (200 ft) long.
- Hyena cave
- Trilobite cave, highest among all the caves of the site, it opens between the Hyena cave and Bear cave; its entrance is framed with two natural stone walls. Its name comes from a trilobite fossil found in it by Dr. Ficatier from Auxerre.
- Bear cave (grotte de l'Ours)
- Reindeer cave (grotte du Renne)
  - Schoepflin gallery (galerie de Schoepflin)
- Bison cave (grotte du Bison)
- Wolf cave (grotte du Loup)
- Lion cave (grotte du Lion)
- Fairies cave
- Two Flows cave (grotte des Deux Cours)
- Small shelter, Large shelter (Petit abri, Grand abri)
- Goulettes cave (grotte des Goulettes)

== Parietal art ==
Prehistoric parietal paintings were discovered by Pierre Guilloré in April 1990 in the Great cave, protected by a thin layer of lime/calcite sediments hiding them from view. But engravings of animals (among which several mammoths in the Horse cave) are recorded at the latest in 1946.

Unfortunately, some of the paintings were destroyed by regular cleanings of the cave's walls with high-pressurized water sprays between 1976 and 1990. At the time no-one thought that under the black smoke layer – at least some of it having come from torches carried during past centuries' visits –, prehistoric paintings could exist under a thin layer of lime sediments hiding them from view.

Made on walls in cave rooms located 300 to 500 m (980 to 1,640 ft) away from the entrance, the paintings are 28,000 years old for the oldest, according to radiocarbon dating measures on charcoal remains discovered in these cave rooms in the corresponding strata. Thus they are the second oldest after the Chauvet Cave (31,000 years old), well before those of Lascaux (15,000 to 18,000 years old); but they cannot compare with the latter in their quantity, as only 160 of them have been found so far, against over 400 in the Chauvet cave and about 1,900 in that of Lascaux.

The paintings were executed with ochre and charcoal. One finds there at the same time some hands of men, women and children, and some representations of animals.

The hands are 'negative hands': they are represented by outlines and not by their surface. One knows precisely today that at least one hand was drawn with some ochre with the help of a pipette.

To represent animals, the first European Homo sapiens often chose parts of the walls of which the relief, under the torches' flickering lighting, would come out as shapes that reminded of the animals' anatomy, such as eyes or the antlers of large deer. They then used the paint sparingly, drawing only the elements that the relief did not show. Only the animals' outlines were generally represented, the inside being left entirely blank.

Here the animals' feet are often open, a feature which is characteristic to these caves. They are generally portrayed with one leg at the front and one leg at the rear. Among the most interesting paintings, one finds a mammoth drawn entirely and a prehistoric stag whose antlers could be 4 meters tall (Megaloceros giganteus), partially depicted while using reliefs in the wall. Other animals also appear among the paintings, such as bear and woolly rhinoceros.

=== Speleothems and calcite deposits ===
The lowest parts of the caves are regularly filled with water. One finds there stalagmites, stalactites, columns, draperies and the Virgin's room.

One of the lakes shows a remarkable phenomenon of limestone deposit that covers the surface of the water, falls to the bottom then periodically comes back up to the surface. This phenomenon is still poorly understood, but does not seem directly due to bacteria. Some parts of this phenomenon are akin to calcite rafts.

The stalactites grow at the noticeable rate of about 1 cm (0.39 in) every 100 years.

Engraved figures on some walls are in plain sight, totally untouched by calcite deposits; whereas such deposits can appear mere inches away from the engravings in some cases. When they do exist these wall deposits grow very quickly. The Horse cave is typical of such behaviour.

== Fauna ==
The caves are home to at least five species of bats. Driven away by visits to the main cave, they were provided a new shelter. Access has been closed to visitors.

== History ==
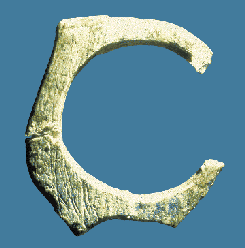
Châtelperronian bone pendant from Arcy-sur-Cure (32 mm wide)

Excavations started in the middle of the 19th century in the Fairies cave with their then owner the marquis de Vibraye. In his wake, the abbé Parat studied the main stratigraphic sequences in the caves and those of Saint-Moré 1,500 m (4,900 ft) upriver. Then from 1946 onward professor Leroy-Gourand and his team worked in the Hyena cave, Reindeer cave, Bison cave and Lagopede cave.

Dug by the Cure river in a limestone massif from the Mesozoic (secondary era), the caves were used as shelter by humans since at least 200,000 years ago. The oldest traces of human presence were stone tools found at the bottom of the cave of the Hyena (grotte de la Hyène), from Neanderthals during the Mousterian (Middle Paleolithic, the middle part of the European Old Stone Age). These were accompanied by bones of hippopotamus, beaver and land tortoise.

Following the time-line, the next stratum is contemporary to the Riss glaciation in the Alps region (corresponding to the Illinoian in America) and contains few artefacts, still in the same cave of the Hyena. The Riss ice age was marked by two glaciations and one interglacial episode in between. During this Riss-Würm interglacial, the river flooded the cave of the Hyena but not continuously: remains of human habitat were found in the 2.5 m (8.2 ft) thick layer of deposits that it left behind. The sand present in the Reindeer cave (grotte du Renne) is thought to have been deposited at the same period.

In these two caves, the next (more recent) layers (Würm stage 1) are rich in Mousterian artifacts; some human remains, notably part of a maxilla and a part of mandible, have been found in the earliest deposits of that stage.

After that first layer of the Würm stage 1 came a period of high humidity and of floodings; the river lever rose by several meters. The lower caves were flooded and the higher ones eroded. At that period some water filtered through the caves' ceiling, draining with it some older sediments and bringing some anomalies in the series of pollen analysis. Thus some pollens (essentially tropical ferns pollens) from the Secondary era were found between two Mousterian layers. This phenomenon has also been found in some places in south-west France and in Provence.

Following this very damp period are a high number of Mousterian strata, notably in the Reindeer cave, the Bison cave and the Schoepflin gallery that prolongs them by 30 meters.

The Reindeer cave (grotte du Renne) holds the richest Châtelperronian collection known to date, notably famous for its bone and ivory works.

== Surroundings ==
1,500 m (4,900 ft) upriver, on the right bank of the Cure, is the Cora site (site Cora or camp Cora). This 25 ha (62 acres) camp was populated around 6,000 years ago (Neolithic followed by a fortified Gaul village then a Gallo-Roman fort) is next to another set of caves similar to those of Arcy and that were also already occupied over 200,000 years ago in a similar situation (coral limestone, high steep bank, concave side of a meander), the fontaine de Saint-Moré (Saint-Moré spring), a Merovingian sarcophagus quarry and a Roman villa.
The fontaine de Saint-Moré was long considered as sacred and drew many processions, pilgrims and supplicants in its time.

The Via Agrippa from Lyon to Boulogne-sur-Mer passed 1 km (0.62 mi) to the west of the caves, crossing the river Cure at the Noère ford (gué Noère, the name meaning "Black ford" in local French) in Saint-Moré. Three discovery paths have been installed at the Cora camp (free access), equipped with historical information panels on the Gallo-Roman fort that guarded the via Agrippa passage.

The GR footpath no. 13_{(fr)} passes right at the top of the cliffs on the same river side as the caves of Arcy-sur-Cure, joining Fontainebleau (Seine-et-Marne, Île-de-France region) to Bourbon-Lancy (Saône-et-Loire, south-west of the Burgundy region).

== Gallery ==
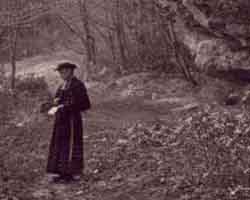
Abbé Parat in front of the Fairies cave

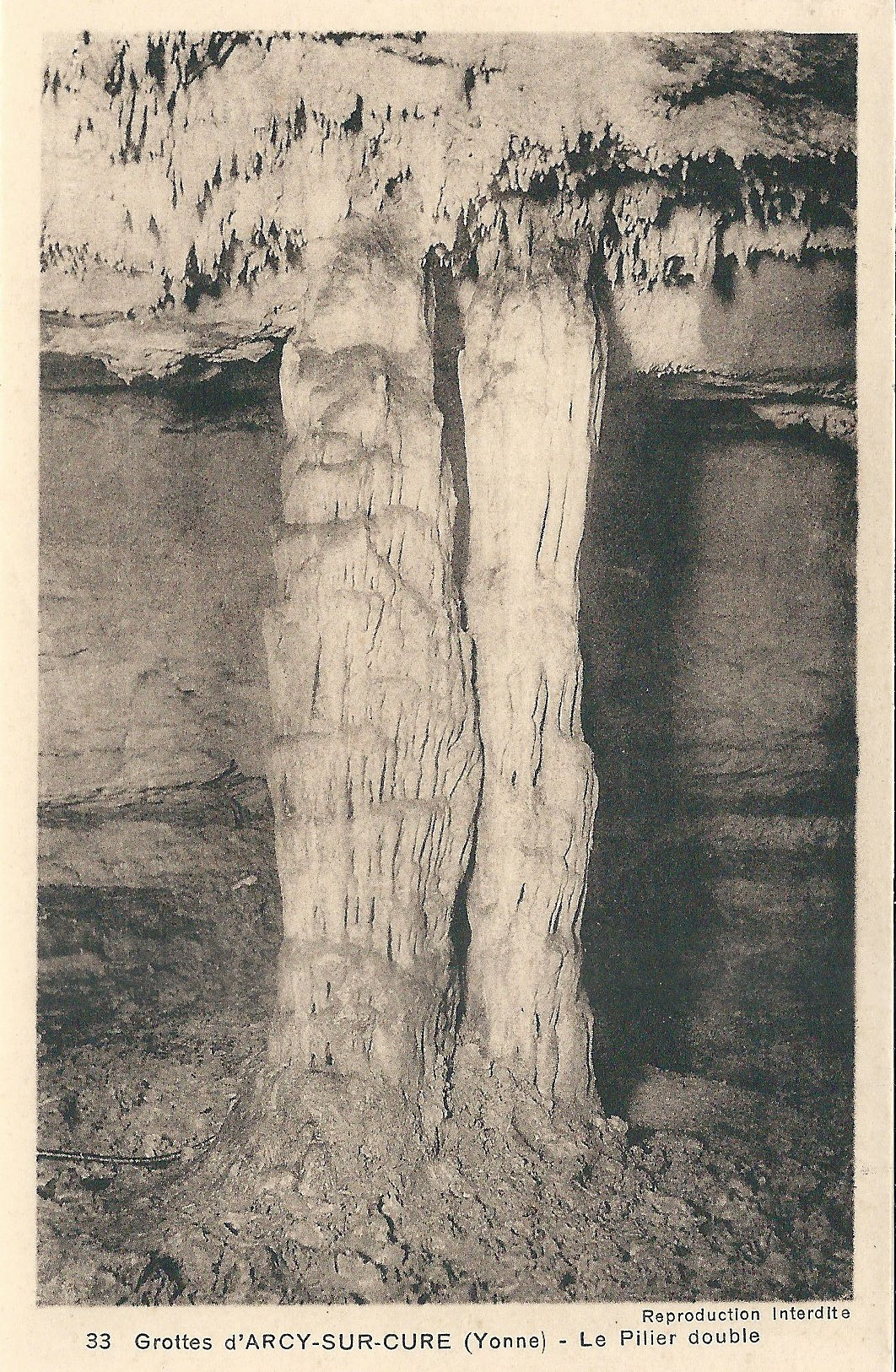
The Double pillar

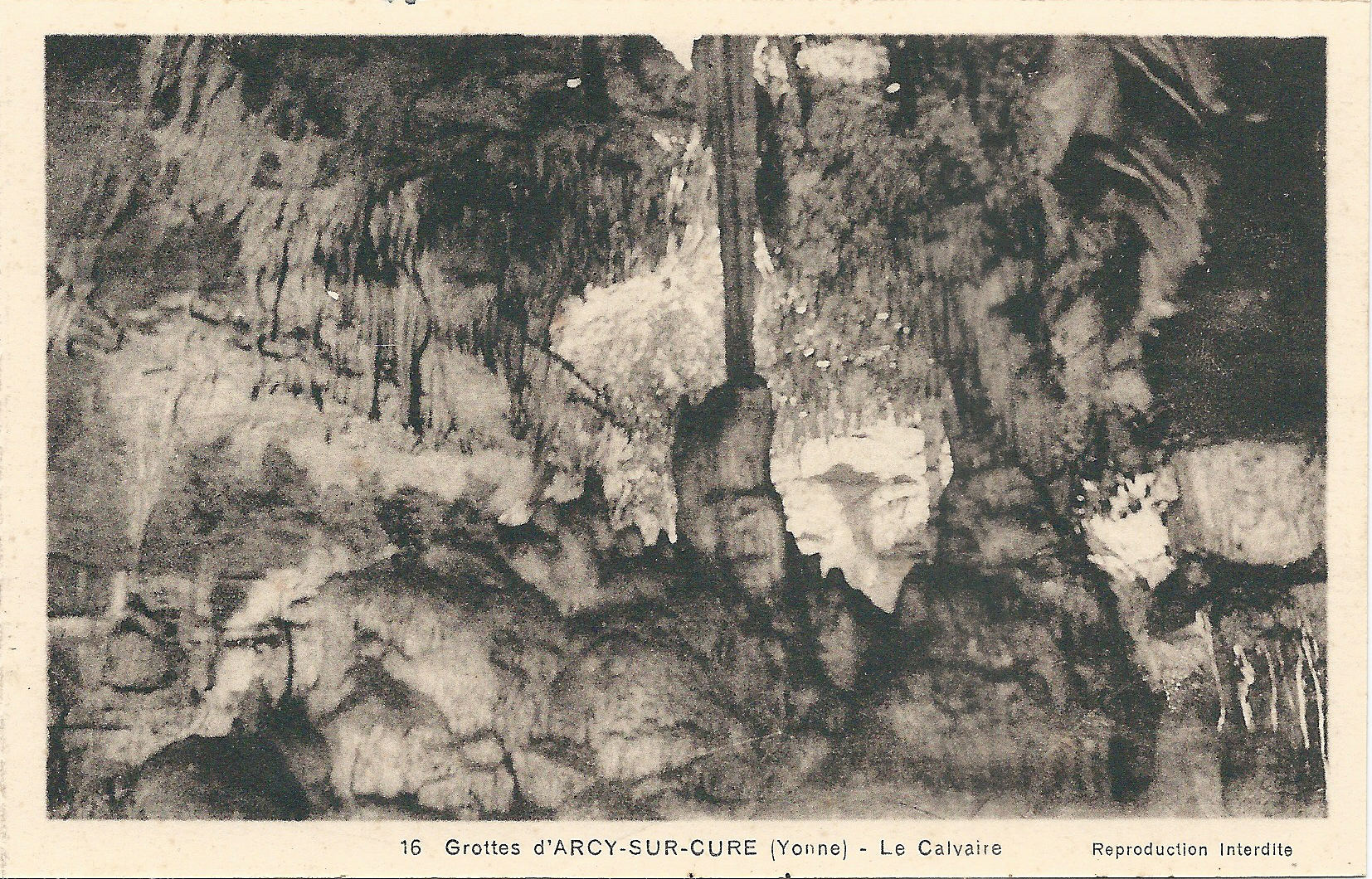
The Calvary

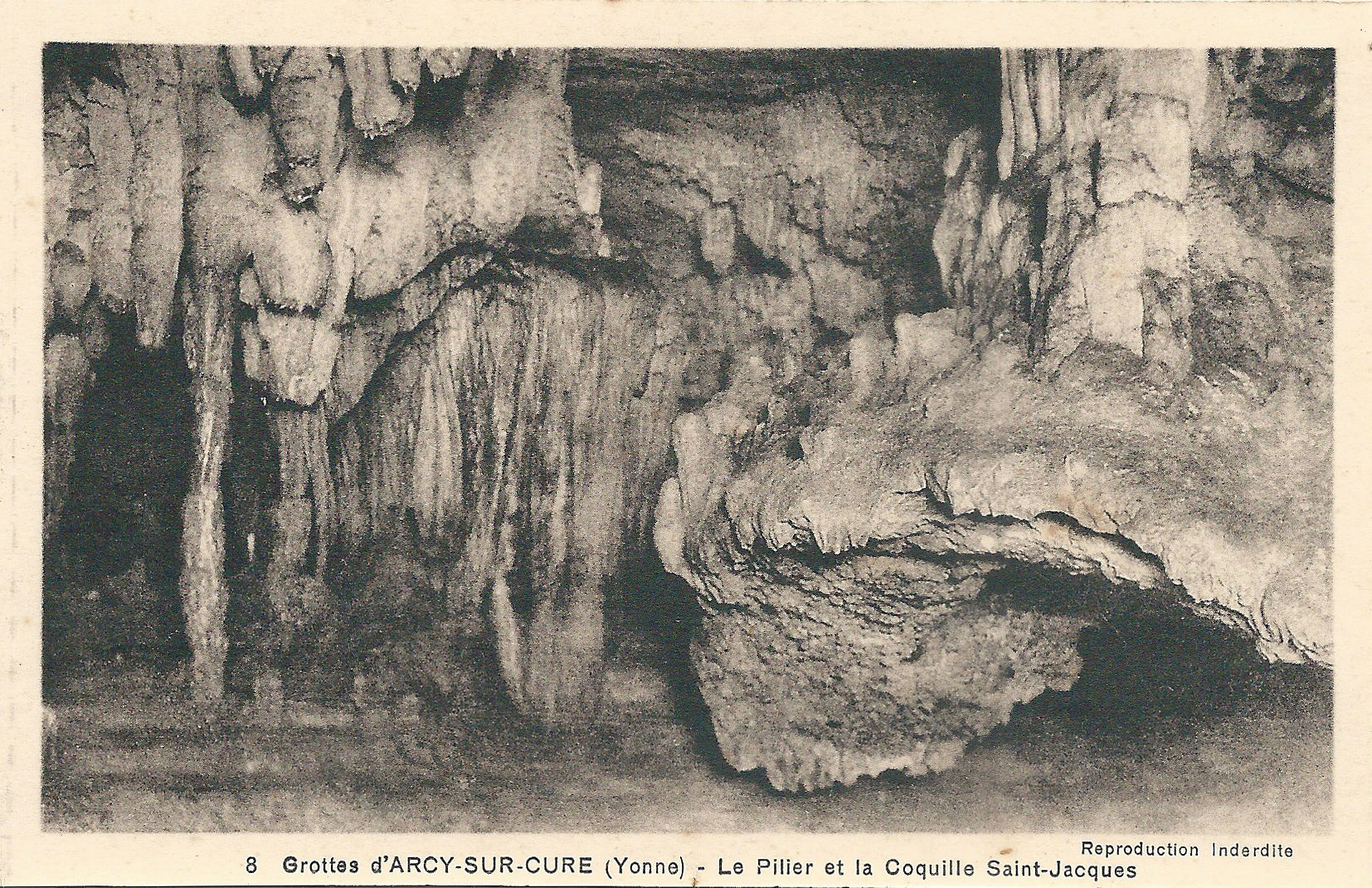
The Scallop pillar

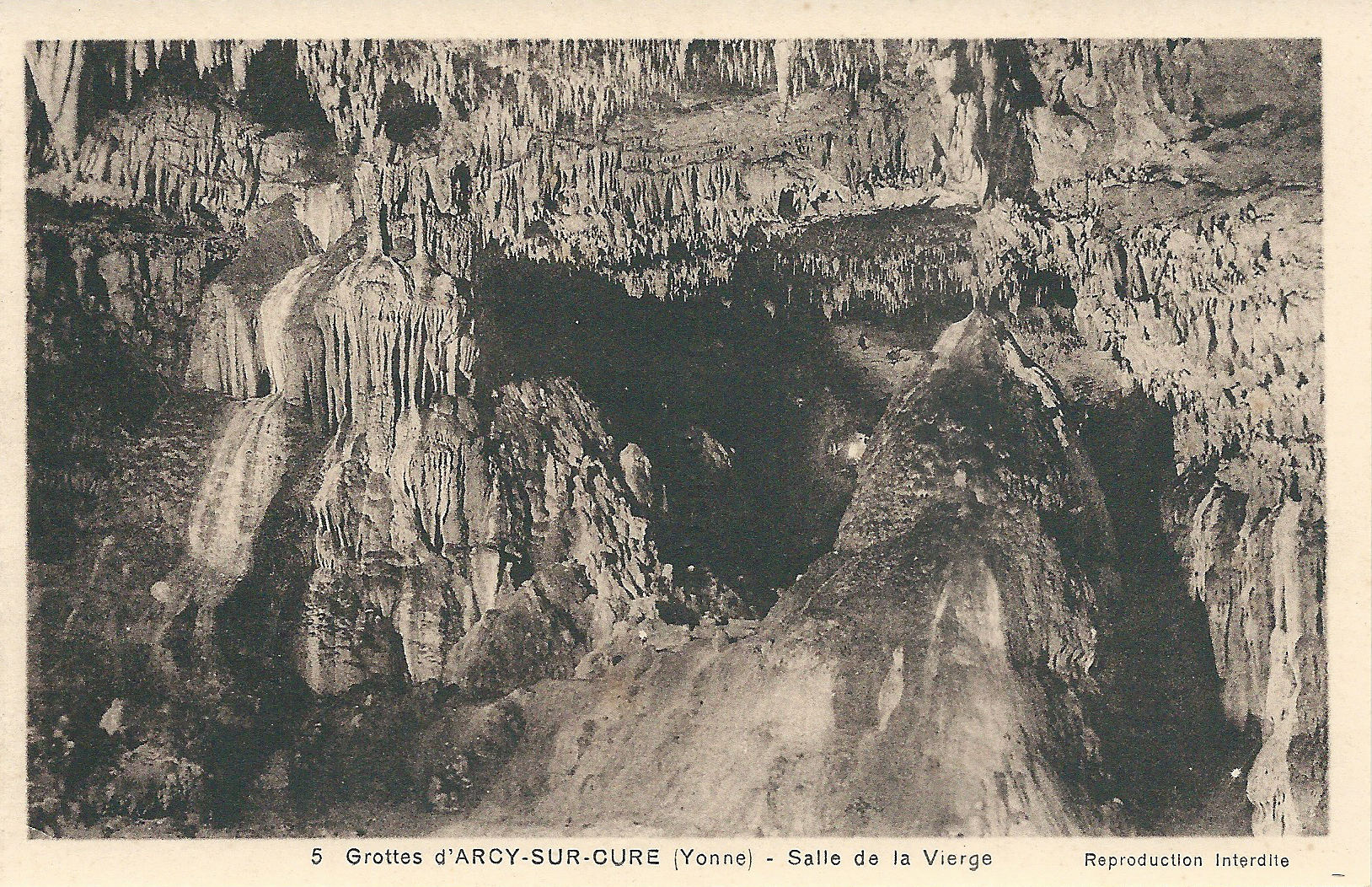
The Virgin room

== See also ==
=== Related articles ===
- Grotte du Renne

=== External links ===
- (in French) Leroy-Gourhan, Arlette and André (1964). "Chronologie des grottes d'Arcy-sur-Cure (Yonne)". Gallia préhistoire. 7 (1): 1–64. doi:10.3406/galip.1964.1238.
