= Vallon-Pont-d'Arc =

- Commune
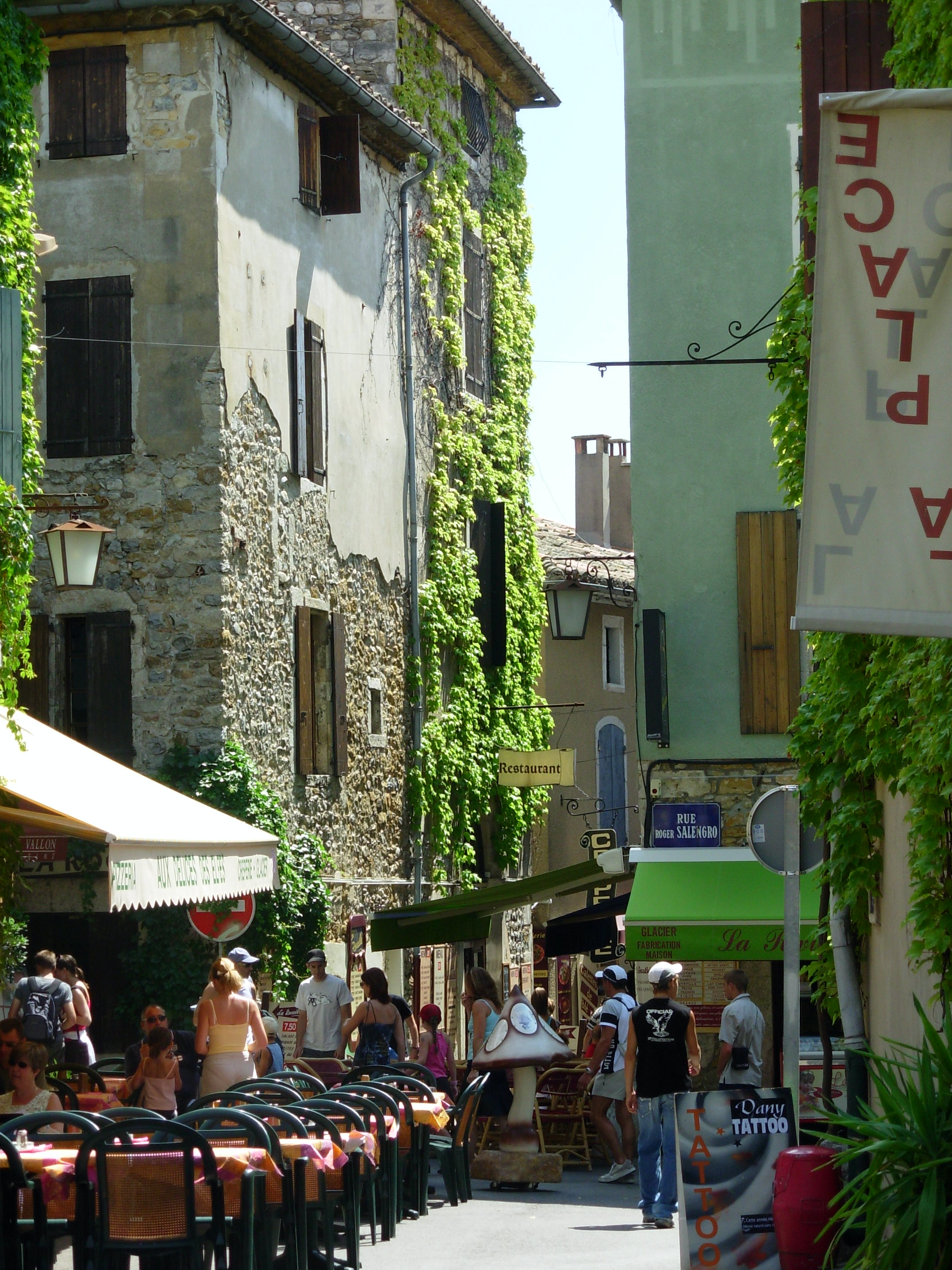

- Coat of arms
- Location of Vallon-Pont-d'Arc
- Location within France Location within Auvergne-Rhône-Alpes
- Coordinates: 44°24′28″N 4°23′40″E
- Country: France
- Region: Auvergne-Rhône-Alpes
- Department: Ardèche
- Arrondissement: Largentière
- Canton: Vallon-Pont-d'Arc

Government
  - Mayor (2020–2026): Guy Massot
- Area^{1}: 28.62 km^{2} (11.05 sq mi)
- Elevation: 118 m (387 ft)
- Highest elevation: 434 m (1,424 ft)
- Lowest elevation: 60 m (200 ft)
- Population (2023): 2,403
  - Density: 83.96/km^{2} (217.5/sq mi)
- Time zone: UTC+01:00 (CET)
  - Summer (DST): UTC+02:00 (CEST)
- INSEE/Postal code: 07330 /07150
- ^{1} French Land Register data, which excludes lakes, ponds, glaciers > 1 km^{2} (0.386 sq mi or 247 acres) and river estuaries.

Vallon-Pont-d'Arc (French pronunciation: [valɔ̃ pɔ̃ daʁk]; Occitan: Valon) is a village in southern France in the Ardèche Department.

The village is a gateway to one of the most beautiful tourist sites in France, the Ardèche Gorges, where the Ardèche river has carved a dramatic canyon through a limestone plateau. The village is named after the Pont d'Arc, a natural rock arch, which has been classified as a Great Site of France.

Vallon-Pont-d'Arc is also the location of a UNESCO World Heritage Site, the decorated cave of Pont d’Arc, known as Grotte Chauvet-Pont d’Arc., and its replica, Chauvet Cave 2. The cave contains some of the earliest known prehistoric paintings in the world and constitutes an exceptional testimony of prehistoric cave art.

In the center of the town is a château built in the 17th century, now the town hall, which is decorated with Aubusson tapestries, as well as the place couverte or old grain square, and the place du Verger.

== Sights ==
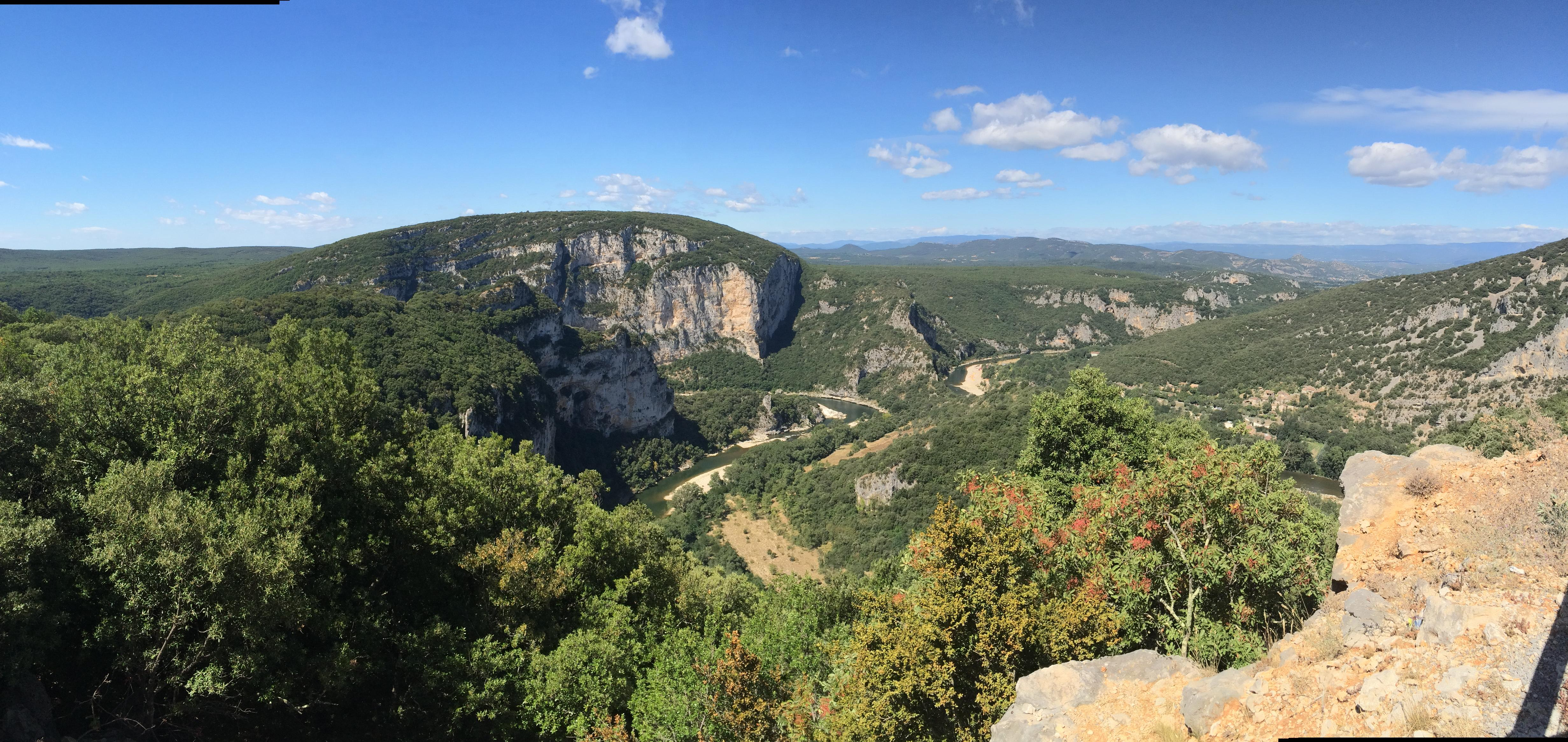
Ardèche River in Vallon-Pont d'Arc

- The Pont d'Arc
- The Chauvet Cave is not open to the public. In 2015, a replica Chauvet Cave 2 was opened to the public, which is the largest decorated replica cavern in the world. Chauvet Cave 2 is also a conference center and hosts workshops and cultural activities relating to prehistoric art and civilization.
- The Gorges de l'Ardèche
- Departure point for the river descent by kayak or canoe of the Gorges de l'Ardèche (from Pont d'Arc to Saint-Martin-d'Ardèche).
- The Château or Hôtel de ville (a castle constructed in 1630-1639 under Louis XIII) houses seven Aubusson tapestries showing the crusades, exhibited in the Salle des Mariages.
- Chastelas outside the village
- Library
- Contemporary art gallery Galerie du Bourdaric
- Nearby, the art studio of Anselm Kiefer La Ribaute.
- Nearby, the Grotte de la Madeleine in Saint-Remèze
- Nearby, the contemporary art gallery in Lagorce Galerie Mirabilia
- Nearby, the Aven d'Orgnac

Nearby there are other beautiful villages, including Salavas, Saint-Montan, Labastide de Virac, Barjac, and Balazuc. For more information, see Gorges de l'Ardèche.

== Events ==
The town is peaceful and quiet in the winter, but extremely lively during the tourist season in the summer. There is a nocturnal market on Tuesday evenings and a market on Thursday mornings. Each spring takes place the Raid nature; in June, L'Ardéchoise, a cycling event, and the Alunna Festival; in August, the Documentary Film Festival in the nearby town of Lussas; and in November, the Marathon in the Gorges. For conferences relating to prehistoric art and civilization, see the calendar of Chauvet Cave 2.

== History ==
=== Prehistory ===
Numerous caves in Vallon-Pont-d'Arc in Ardèche testify to the human presence in the area for over 30,000 years:

Caves that are registered as historical monuments include:

  - Grotte du Bouchon
  - Grotte de la Vacheresse
  - Chauvet Cave with its replica Chauvet Cave 2.

== Personalities ==
- Artist René Aberlenc (1920-1971)

== Climate ==
Vallon-Pont-d'Arc has a humid subtropical climate (Cfa) according to the Köppen climate classification.

Climate data for Vallon-Pont-d'Arc (120m, 1991–2010 averages, extremes 1991-2020)
Month	Jan	Feb	Mar	Apr	May	Jun	Jul	Aug	Sep	Oct	Nov	Dec	Year
Record high °C (°F)	19.7 (67.5)	22.2 (72.0)	29.1 (84.4)	31.2 (88.2)	35 (95)	40.8 (105.4)	40.5 (104.9)	42.1 (107.8)	36.6 (97.9)	30 (86)	21.9 (71.4)	17.7 (63.9)	42.1 (107.8)
Mean daily maximum °C (°F)	8.5 (47.3)	11.3 (52.3)	16.2 (61.2)	19.2 (66.6)	23.8 (74.8)	28 (82)	31.2 (88.2)	30.8 (87.4)	24.7 (76.5)	18.6 (65.5)	12.5 (54.5)	8.8 (47.8)	19.5 (67.1)
Daily mean °C (°F)	4.6 (40.3)	6.1 (43.0)	9.9 (49.8)	12.7 (54.9)	16.9 (62.4)	20.7 (69.3)	23.3 (73.9)	23.1 (73.6)	18.3 (64.9)	13.9 (57.0)	8.6 (47.5)	5.1 (41.2)	13.6 (56.5)
Mean daily minimum °C (°F)	0.6 (33.1)	0.9 (33.6)	3.6 (38.5)	6.1 (43.0)	10 (50)	13.4 (56.1)	15.5 (59.9)	15.4 (59.7)	11.9 (53.4)	9.2 (48.6)	4.6 (40.3)	1.5 (34.7)	7.8 (46.0)
Record low °C (°F)	−10.5 (13.1)	−10.2 (13.6)	−12.5 (9.5)	−3.5 (25.7)	−0.8 (30.6)	5.9 (42.6)	7.1 (44.8)	7.6 (45.7)	2.1 (35.8)	−2.9 (26.8)	−8.6 (16.5)	−10.3 (13.5)	−12.5 (9.5)
Average precipitation mm (inches)	75.8 (2.98)	50.1 (1.97)	42.9 (1.69)	79.5 (3.13)	93.4 (3.68)	59.6 (2.35)	46.5 (1.83)	58.5 (2.30)	151.7 (5.97)	142.1 (5.59)	120.5 (4.74)	82.9 (3.26)	1,003.5 (39.51)
Average precipitation days (≥ 1.0 mm)	7.2	4.9	4.4	7.6	7.9	5.7	4.1	5.4	6.7	8.4	8.0	6.9	76.9
Source: Meteo France

== Administration ==
List of mayors
Period	Name	Party
1989–1995	Jean-Pierre Ageron	PS
1995–2001	Jean-Pierre Ageron	PS
2001–2008	Pierre Peschier	DVD
2008–2014	Claude Benahmed	PS
2014–2020	Pierre Peschier	DVD
2020–present	Guy Massot	

== Population ==
Historical population
Year	Pop.	±% p.a.
1968	1,831	—
1975	1,837	+0.05%
1982	1,787	−0.39%
1990	1,914	+0.86%
1999	2,027	+0.64%
2007	2,424	+2.26%
2012	2,343	−0.68%
2017	2,382	+0.33%
2023	2,403	+0.15%
Source: INSEE

== See also ==
- Communes of the Ardèche department
