= Grotte du Renne =

Cave in France and significant archaeological site

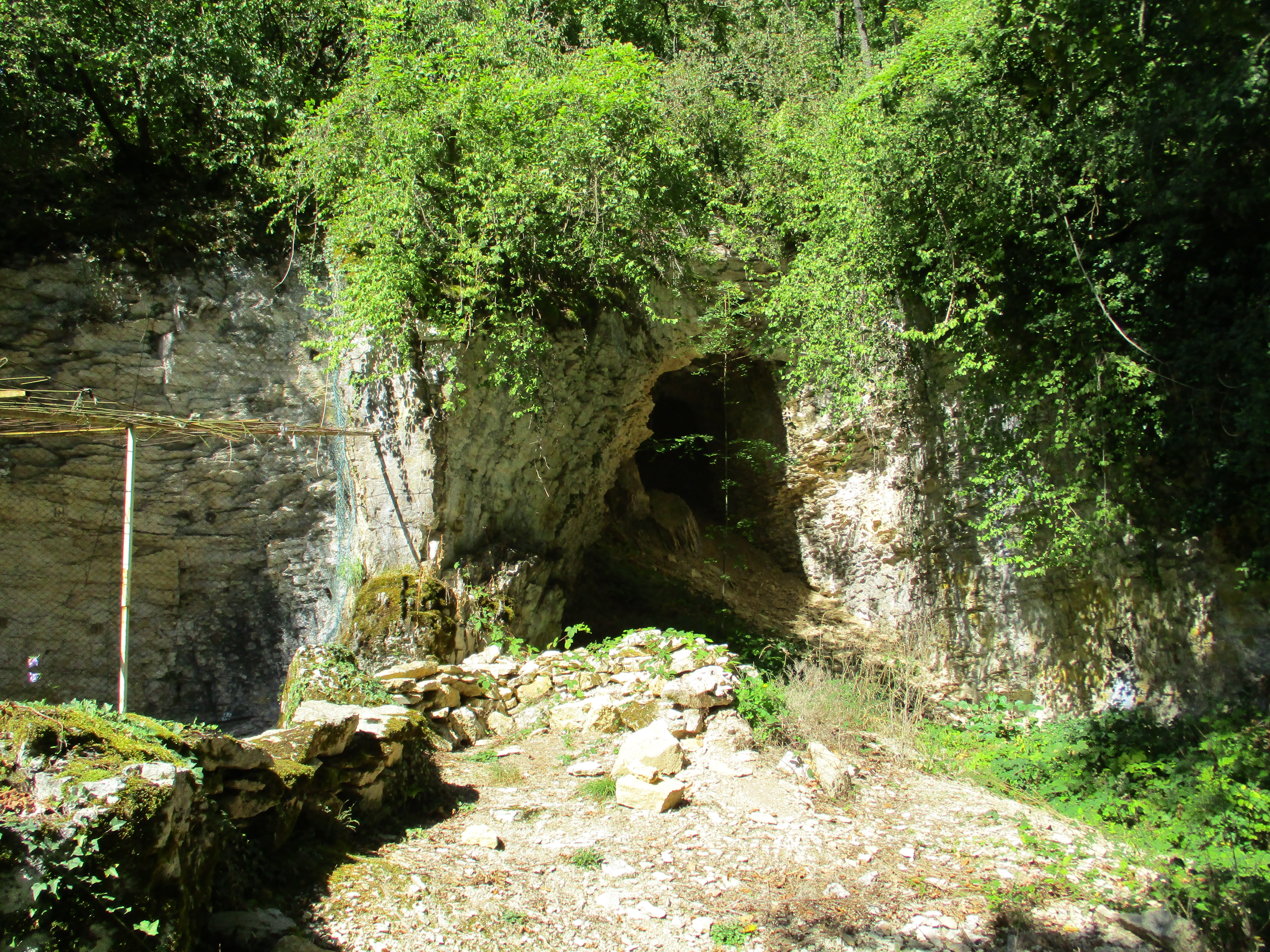

- location in France
- 47°36′13″N 3°44′27″E
- Type: limestone karst cave complex
- Periods: late Upper Paleolithic
- Cultures: Châtelperronian
- Associated with: Neanderthal
- Location: caves of Arcy-sur-Cure
- Region: France

The Grotte du Renne (French for "Reindeer's cave") is one of the many caves at Arcy-sur-Cure in France, an archaeological site of the Middle/Upper Paleolithic period in the Yonne departement, Bourgogne-Franche-Comté. It contains Châtelperronian lithic industry and Neanderthal remains. Grotte du Renne has been argued to provide the best evidence that Neanderthals developed aspects of modern behaviour before contact with modern humans, but this has been challenged by radiological dates, which suggest mixing of later human artifacts with Neanderthal remains. However, it has also been argued that the radiometric dates have been affected by post-recovery contamination, and statistical testing suggests the association between Neanderthal remains, Châtelperronian artefacts and personal ornaments is genuine, not the result of post-depositional processes.

== Site ==
It has 15 archaeological levels that cover a depth of about 4 m. From top to base they are labelled I to XV. Those of IV, V and VI are Gravettian. Level VII is Aurignacian. VIII, IX and X are Châtelperronian (42 kya); level X contains symbolic ornaments, awls, pierced animal teeth, and ivory pendants considered a part of the Chatelperronian. In 2023, 76 Neanderthal fossils were reported from level X during excavations in 1949, 1963, and 1976. XI and XII are Mousterian with denticulate tools. XIV is typical old Mousterian.

Faunal remains include reindeer and horse, and these animals are the source of some of the bone tools used at the site. Some mammoth remains are visible, interpreted by Leroi-Gourhan as evidence for huts at the entrance, but this has not been substantiated.

== Neanderthal behavior ==
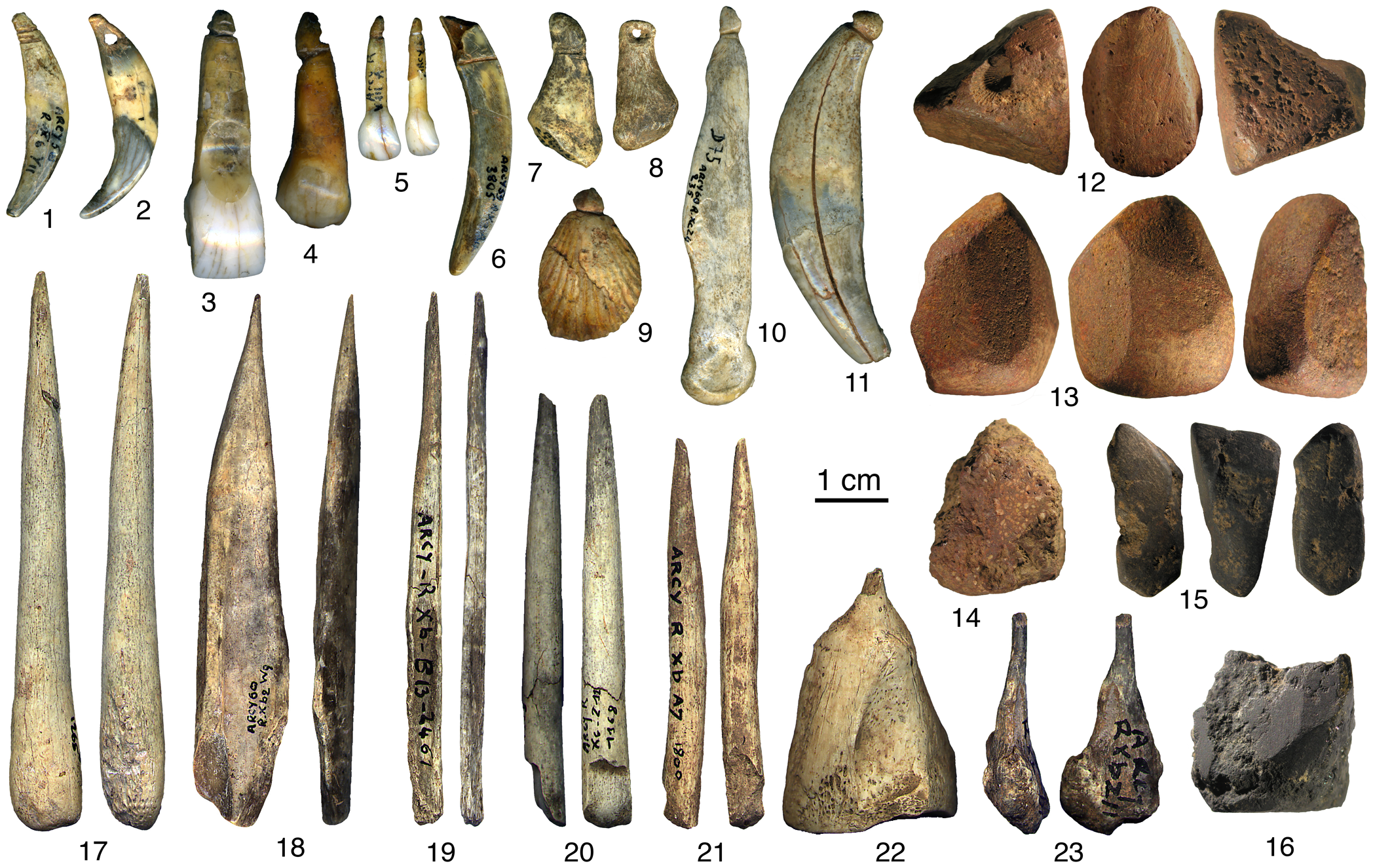
Ivory artefacts from Grotte du Renne

Because Neanderthal remains coexist with artifacts showing complex behavior, such as personal ornaments, it has been argued that they had acquired the capacity for complex symbolic behavior associated with modern humans.

Paul Mellars notes, on the basis of new radiocarbon dating on the cave of Grotte du Renne, "that there was strong possibility — if not probability — that they were stratigraphically intrusive into the Châtelperronian deposits from .. overlying Proto-Aurignacian levels" and that "The central and inescapable implication of the new dating results from the Grotte du Renne is that the single most impressive and hitherto widely cited pillar of evidence for the presence of complex "symbolic" behavior among the late Neanderthal populations in Europe has now effectively collapsed.". Caron et al. challenge this interpretation, arguing that the radiocarbon dates have been affected by incomplete decontamination, that there is no evidence for general displacement of artefacts between the stratigraphic layers, that the associations between Neanderthal remains and artefacts are therefore genuine, and that Grotte du Renne is complemented by evidence for similar Neanderthal behaviour from Iberian and Italian sites.
