= Pincevent =

Archaeological site in France

Coordinates: 48°22′5″N 2°53′40″E

Pincevent is an archaeological site in the commune of La Grande-Paroisse in France, near the town of Montereau-Fault-Yonne (Seine-et-Marne).

It was excavated from 1964 onward by a team of the Centre des Recherches Préhistoriques of the University of Paris, led by André Leroi-Gourhan. Although there is evidence that the area was visited throughout the Late Pleistocene and Holocene, the site has become known for its Magdalenian remains, preserved in clays and silts deposited by the river Seine. These remains consist of stone artifacts and bone fragments, as well as numerous hearths, and are considered to point to repeated occupation by reindeer hunters.
