= Chauvet Cave =

French cave with prehistoric paintings

Chauvet-Pont-d'Arc Cave
UNESCO World Heritage Site
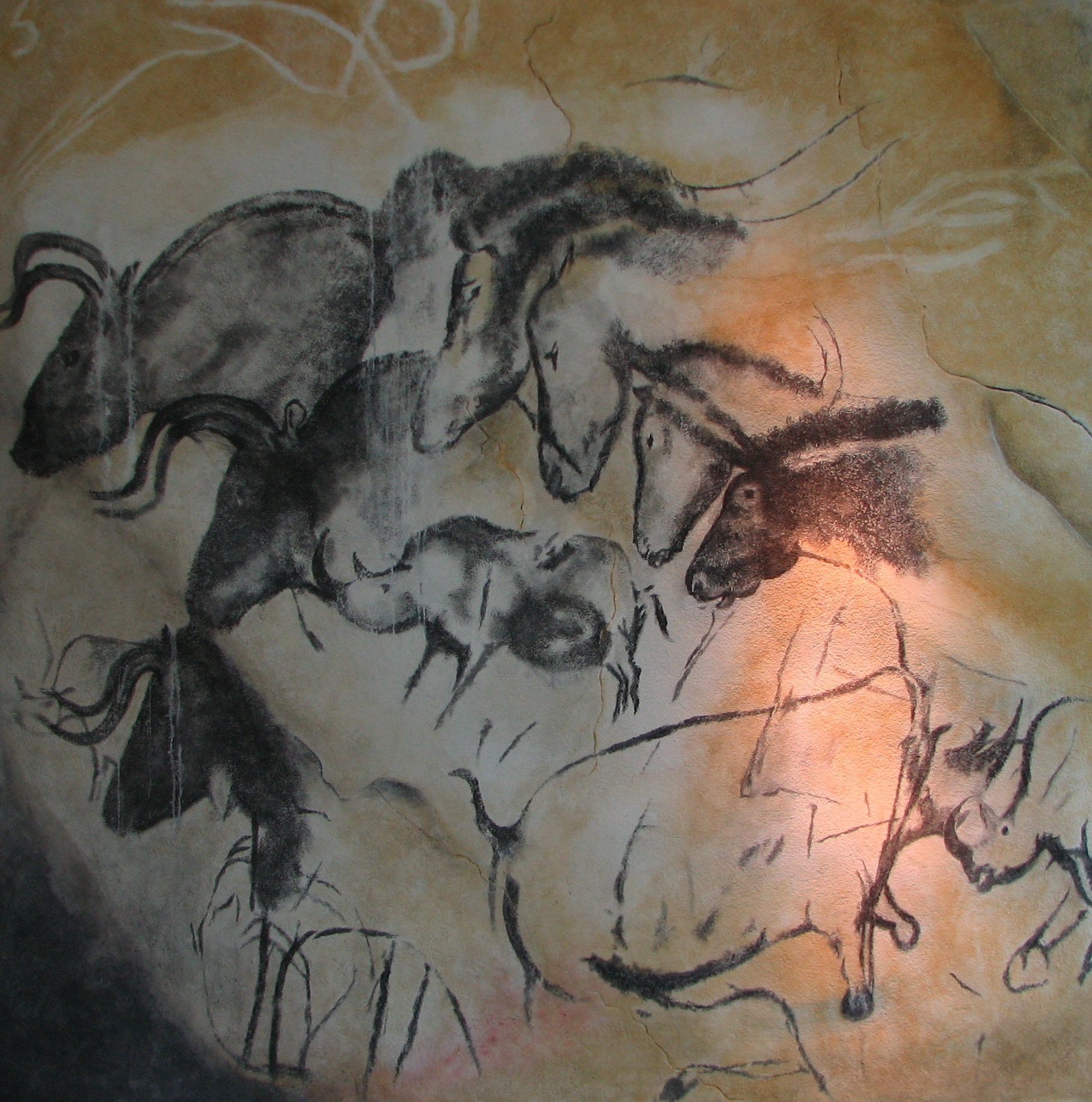
- Replica of paintings in the Chauvet Cave

- Location within France
- Location: Ardèche, France
- Criteria: Cultural: i, iii
- Reference: 1426
- Inscription: 2014 (38th Session)
- Area: 9 ha (22 acres)
- Buffer zone: 1,353 ha (3,340 acres)
- Website: https://archeologie.culture.gouv.fr/chauvet/fr
- Coordinates: 44°23′15″N 4°24′51″E

The Chauvet-Pont-d'Arc Cave (French: Grotte Chauvet-Pont d'Arc [ɡʁɔt ʃovɛ pɔ̃ daʁk]) in the Ardèche department of southeastern France is a cave that contains some of the best-preserved figurative cave paintings in the world, as well as other evidence of Upper Paleolithic life. It is located near the commune of Vallon-Pont-d'Arc on a limestone cliff above the former bed of the river Ardèche, in the Gorges de l'Ardèche.

Rediscovered on 18 December 1994, it is considered one of the most important prehistoric art sites, and on 22 June 2014 the UN's cultural agency UNESCO granted it World Heritage status. The cave was first explored by a group of three speleologists: Eliette Brunel-Deschamps, Christian Hillaire, and Jean-Marie Chauvet (for whom the cave was named) six months after an aperture now known as "Le Trou de Baba" ('Baba's Hole') was discovered by Michel Rosa (Baba). At a later date the group returned to the cave. Another member of this group, Michel Chabaud, along with two others, travelled further into the cave and discovered the Gallery of the Lions, the End Chamber. Chauvet has his own detailed account of the discovery. In addition to the paintings and other human evidence, they also discovered fossilized remains, prints, and markings from a variety of animals, some of which are now extinct.

Further study by French archaeologist Jean Clottes has revealed much about the site. The dates have been a matter of dispute, but a study published in 2012 supports placing the art in the Aurignacian period, approximately 32,000–30,000 years ago. A study published in 2016 using an additional 88 radiocarbon dates showed two periods of habitation, one 37,000 to 33,500 years ago and the second from 31,000 to 28,000 years ago, with most of the black drawings dating to the earlier period.

== Features ==
The cave is situated above the previous course of the Ardèche before the Pont d'Arc opened up. The gorges of the Ardèche region are the site of numerous caves, many of them having some geological or archaeological importance.

Based on radiocarbon dating, the cave appears to have been used by humans during two distinct periods: the Aurignacian and the Gravettian. Most of the artwork dates to the earlier of the two, the Aurignacian era (32,000 to 30,000 years ago). The later Gravettian occupation, which occurred 27,000 to 25,000 years ago, left little but a child's footprints, the charred remains of ancient hearths, and carbon smoke stains from torches that lit the caves. The footprints may be the oldest human footprints that can be accurately dated. After the child's visit to the cave, evidence suggests that due to a landslide that covered its historical entrance, the cave remained untouched until it was discovered in 1994.

The soft, clay-like floor of the cave retains the paw prints of cave bears along with large, rounded depressions that are believed to be the "nests" where the bears slept. Fossilised bones are abundant and include the skulls of cave bears and the horned skull of an ibex. Paw-prints dated to 26,000 YBP are suggested as being those of a dog; however, these have been challenged as being left by a wolf.

== Paintings ==
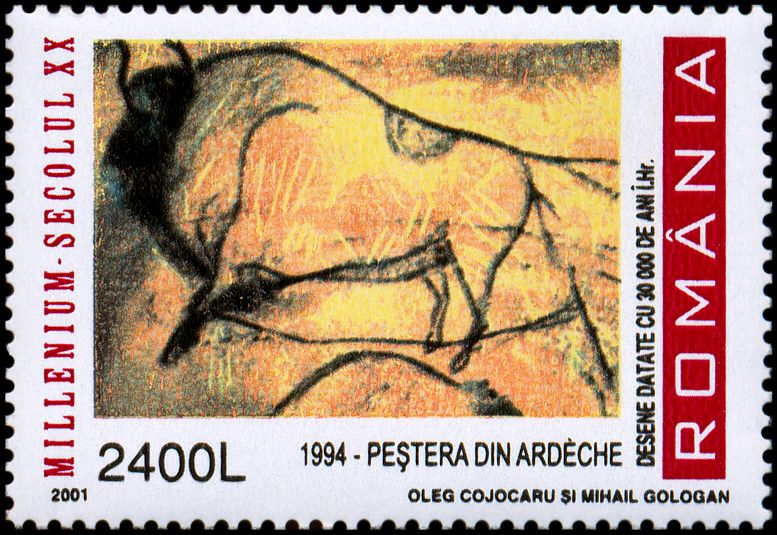
Image of steppe wisent (Bison priscus). Paintings in the Chauvet Cave on postage stamp of Romania 2001

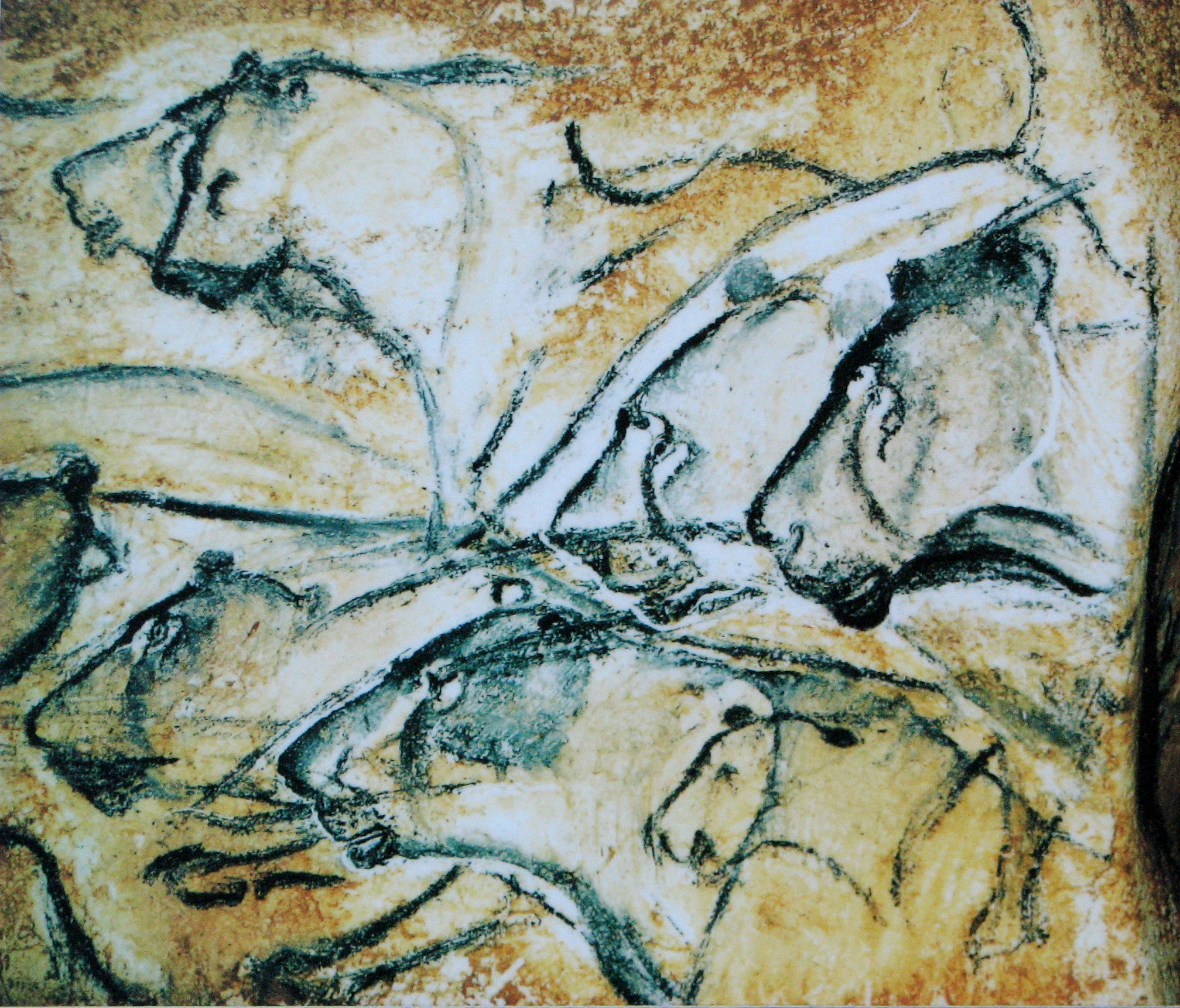
Replica of painting of lions

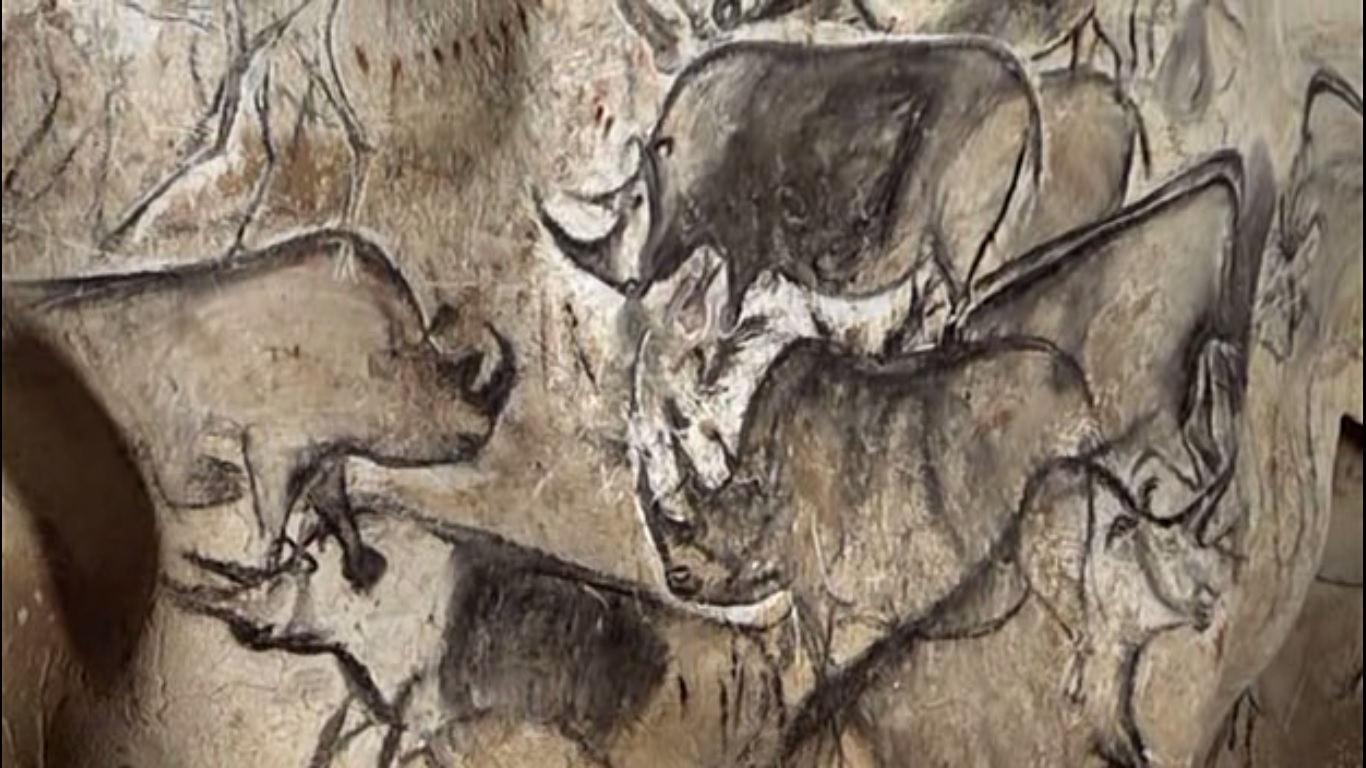
A group of rhinos

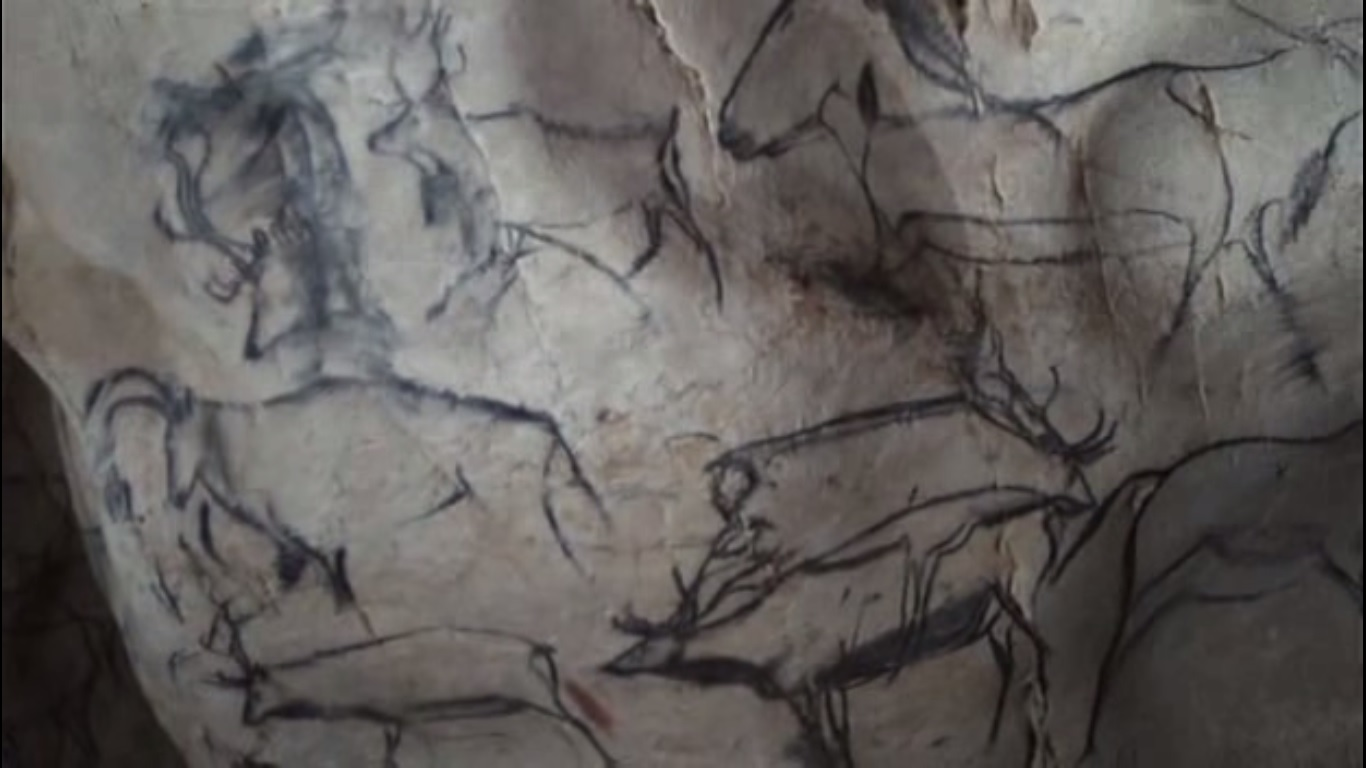
Painting of deer

Hundreds of animal paintings have been catalogued, depicting at least 13 different species, including some rarely or never found in other ice age paintings. Rather than depicting only the familiar herbivores that predominate in Paleolithic cave art, i.e. horses, aurochs, mammoths, etc., the walls of the Chauvet Cave feature many predatory animals, e.g., cave lions, leopards, bears, and cave hyenas. There are also paintings of rhinoceroses.

Typical of most cave art, there are no paintings of complete human figures, although there are two partial "Venus" figures: one within a niche or vestibule of the End Chamber, and the other on a roughly conical or dental-shaped pendant several metres away; both are composed of what appears to be a vulva attached to an incomplete pair of legs. Above the pendant Venus, and in contact with it, is a bison head, which has led some to describe the composite drawing as a Minotaur.

There are a few panels of red ochre hand prints and hand stencils made by blowing pigment over hands pressed against the cave surface. Abstract markings—lines and dots—are found throughout the cave. There are also two unidentifiable images that have a vaguely butterfly or avian shape to them. This combination of subjects has led some students of prehistoric art and cultures to believe that there was a ritual, shamanic, or magical aspect to these paintings.

One drawing, later overlaid with a sketch of a deer, is reminiscent of a volcano spewing lava, similar to the regional volcanoes that were active at the time. If confirmed, this would represent the earliest known drawing of a volcanic eruption.

The artists who produced these paintings used techniques rarely found in other cave art. Many of the paintings appear to have been made only after the walls were scraped clear of debris and concretions, leaving a smoother and noticeably lighter area upon which the artists worked. Similarly, a three-dimensional quality and the suggestion of movement are achieved by incising or etching around the outlines of certain figures. The art is also exceptional for its time for including "scenes", e.g., animals interacting with each other; a pair of woolly rhinoceros, for example, are seen butting horns in an apparent contest for territory or mating rights.

A research team led by Philippe Walter with scientists from Sorbonne Université and the French National Centre for Scientific Research have discovered in 2026 that the paintings have a fine, translucent layer of calcite. The team discovered this using a technique that uses ultraviolet beams, and believe it may be acting as a natural varnish.

== Dating ==
The cave contains some of the oldest known cave paintings, based on radiocarbon dating of "black from drawings, from torch marks and from the floors", according to Jean Clottes. Clottes concludes that the "dates fall into two groups, one centred around 27,000–26,000 BP and the other around 32,000–30,000 BP." As of 1999, the dates of 31 samples from the cave had been reported. The earliest, sample Gifa 99776 from "zone 10", dates to 32,900 ± 490 BP.

Some archaeologists have questioned these dates. Christian Züchner, relying on stylistic comparisons with similar paintings at other well-dated sites, expressed the opinion that the red paintings are from the Gravettian period (c. 28,000–23,000 BP) and the black paintings are from the Early Magdalenian period (early part of c. 18,000–10,000 BP). Pettitt and Bahn also contended that the dating is inconsistent with the traditional stylistic sequence and that there is uncertainty about the source of the charcoal used in the drawings and the extent of surface contamination on the exposed rock surfaces. Stylistic studies showed that some Gravettian engravings are superimposed on black paintings, proving the paintings' older origins.

By 2011, more than 80 radiocarbon dates had been taken, with samples from torch marks and from the paintings themselves, as well as from animal bones and charcoal found on the cave floor. The radiocarbon dates from these samples suggest that there were two periods of creation in Chauvet: 35,000 years ago and 30,000 years ago. This would place the occupation and painting of the cave within the Aurignacian period.

A research article published in Proceedings of the National Academy of Sciences in May 2012 by scientists from the University of Savoy, Aix-Marseille University and the Centre National de Prehistoire confirmed that the paintings were created by people in the Aurignacian era, between 30,000 and 32,000 years ago. The researchers' findings are based on the analysis using geomorphological and ^{36}Cl dating of the rock slide surfaces around what is believed to be the cave's only entrance. Their analysis showed that the entrance was sealed by a collapsing cliff some 29,000 years ago. Their findings put the date of human presence in the cave and the paintings in line with that deduced from radiocarbon dating, i.e., between 32,000 and 30,000 years BP.

A 2016 study in the same journal examining 259 radiocarbon dates, some unpublished before, concluded that there were two phases of human occupation, one running from 37,000 to 33,500 years ago and the second from 31,000 to 28,000 years ago. All but two of the dates for the black drawings were from the earlier phase. The authors believe that the first phase ended with a rockfall that sealed the cave, with two more rockfalls at the end of the second occupation phase after which no humans or large animals entered the cave until it was rediscovered. In an email to the Los Angeles Times two of the authors explained,

A human group (band or tribe) visited the Chauvet cave during the first period around 36,000 years ago for cultural purposes. They produced black drawings of huge mammals. Then, several thousands of years after, another group from another place with another culture visited the cave.

In 2020, researchers used the new IntCal20 radiocarbon calibration curve to estimate that the oldest painting in the cave was created 36,500 years ago.

In parallel with the dating carried out in Chauvet cave itself, from 2008 onwards, several members of the scientific team in charge of studying the cave undertook chronological research in other rock art sites along the Ardèche river gorges under the direction of Julien Monney. It took place at Points cave (Aiguèze; Gard; France), which presents flagrant iconographic similarities with Chauvet cave, but also at Deux-Ouvertures cave. Under the name of "Datation Grottes Ornées" (or DGO) project, this research is intended to determine the context in which the rock art caves of the region were visited. The DGO project proposes to discuss the apparent chronological and iconographic exceptionality of Chauvet cave "from the outside" by placing it within a regional ensemble. This research is still in progress (2020). However, it has already produced many results indirectly concerning the chronology of Chauvet cave.

== Preservation ==
VOA report about the cave and its replica

The cave has been sealed off to the public since 1994. Access is severely restricted owing to the experience with decorated caves such as Altamira and Lascaux found in the 19th and 20th century, where the admission of visitors on a large scale led to the growth of mold on the walls that damaged the art in places. In 2000 the archaeologist and expert on cave paintings Dominique Baffier was appointed to oversee conservation and management of the cave. She was followed in 2014 by Marie Bardisa.

Caverne du Pont-d'Arc (Grotte Chauvet 2), a facsimile of Chauvet Cave on the model of the so-called "Faux Lascaux", was opened to the general public on 25 April 2015. It is the largest cave replica ever built worldwide, ten times bigger than the Lascaux facsimile. The art is reproduced full-size in a condensed replica of the underground environment, in a circular building above ground, a few kilometres from the actual cave. Visitors' senses are stimulated by the same sensations of silence, darkness, temperature, humidity, and acoustics, carefully reproduced.

== See also ==
- Art of the Upper Paleolithic
- Cave of Forgotten Dreams, a 2010 documentary film about Chauvet Cave by Werner Herzog
- Coliboaia Cave in Romania, where 35–32,000-year-old figures were drawn using a similar technique
- List of Stone Age art
