= Revolt of Cairo =

1798 revolt of the French invasion of Egypt and Syria

- Part of the French invasion of Egypt and Syria
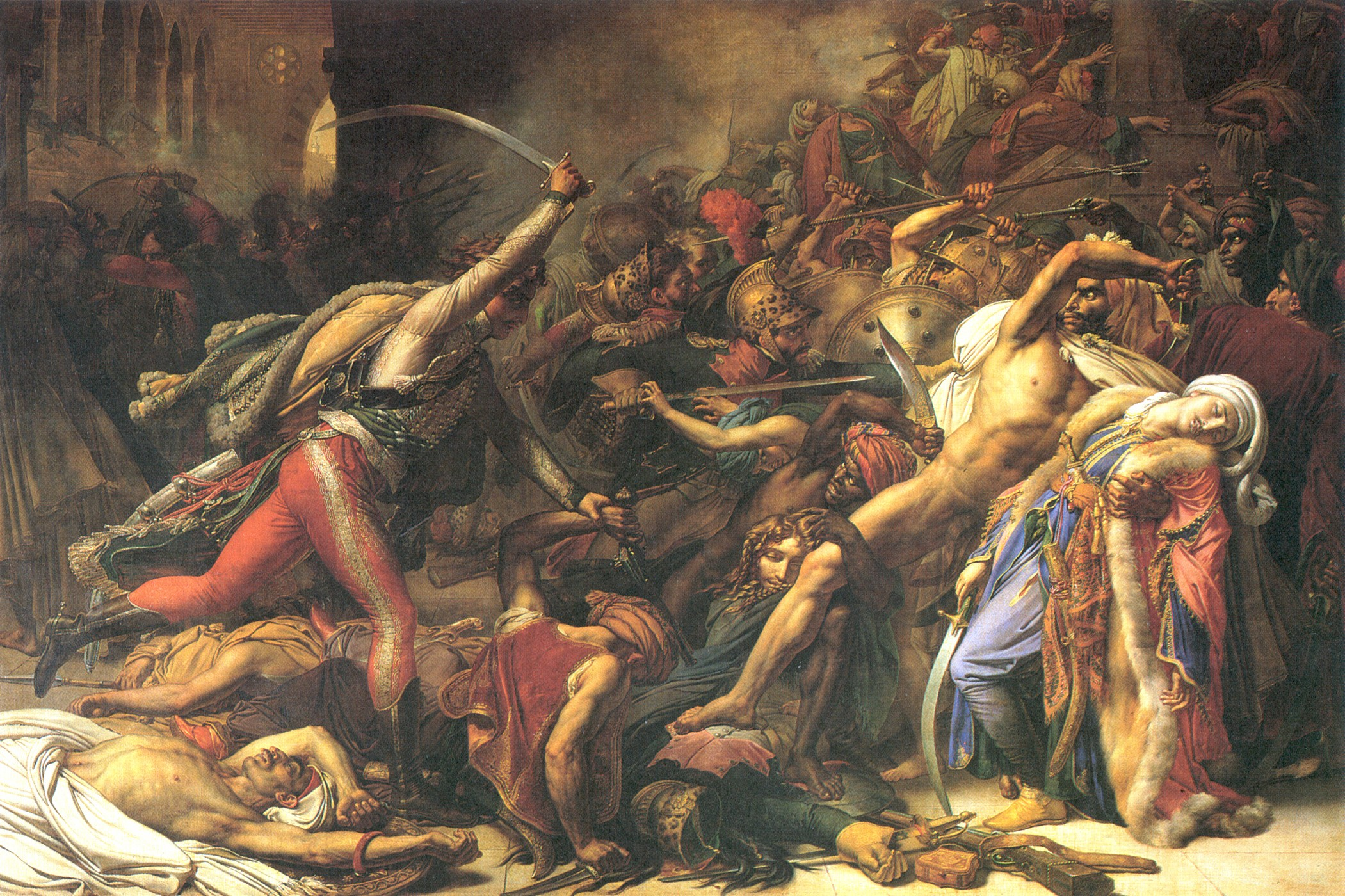
- The Revolt of Cairo; Anne-Louis Girodet de Roussy-Trioson, 1810
Date	21–22 October 1798
Location	Cairo, Ottoman Egypt 30.0446°N 31.2456°E
Result	French victory

Belligerents
France	Cairene rebels

Commanders and leaders
Napoleon	Unknown

Strength
20,000	80,000

Casualties and losses
300 killed 500 wounded	5,000–6,000 killed or wounded
- Location within Mediterranean Revolt of Cairo (Earth)

War of the Second Coalition:
Egypt and Syria
current battle
Napoleon in command till 23 August 1799

The Revolt of Cairo was a rebellion that occurred on 21–22 October 1798 by inhabitants of Cairo against the French occupation. It was suppressed by the French Army of the Orient under Napoleon.

== Revolt ==
In 1798, Napoleon led the French Revolutionary Army's Army of the Orient in an invasion of Egypt, swiftly capturing and occupying Alexandria and Cairo. However, in October of that year, discontent against the French led to an uprising by the people of Cairo. While Napoleon was in Old Cairo, the city's population began spreading weapons around to one another and fortifying strongpoints, especially at the Al-Azhar Mosque. A French commander, Dominique Dupuy, was killed by the revolting Egyptians, as well as Napoleon's aide-de-camp, Józef Sułkowski. Excited by the sheikhs and imams, many of the locals swore by the Prophet to exterminate all and any Frenchman they met, and all Frenchmen they encountered – at home or in the streets – were killed. Crowds rallied at the city gates to keep out Napoleon, who was repulsed and forced to take a detour to get in via the Boulaq gate.

The French army's situation was critical – the British were threatening French control of Egypt after their victory at the Battle of the Nile, Murad Bey and his army were still in the field in Upper Egypt, and the generals Menou and Dugua were only just able to maintain control of Lower Egypt. The Egyptians had common cause with those rising against the French in Cairo – the whole region was in revolt.

The French responded by setting up cannons in the Citadel and firing them at areas containing rebel forces. During the night, French soldiers advanced around Cairo and destroyed any barricades and fortifications they came across. The rebels soon began to be pushed back by the strength of the French forces, gradually losing control of their areas of the city. Napoleon personally hunted down rebels from street to street and forced them to seek refuge in the Al-Azhar Mosque. Napoleon said that "He [i.e God] is too late – you've begun, now I will finish!". He then immediately ordered his cannon to open fire on the Mosque. The French broke down the gates and stormed into the building, massacring the inhabitants. At the end of the revolt 5,000 to 6,000 Egyptians were dead or wounded.

== Aftermath ==
Back in absolute control of Cairo, Bonaparte sought out the authors and instigators of the revolt. Several sheikhs, along with various people of influence, were convicted of participation in the plot and executed. To complete his punishment, a heavy tax was placed upon the city and its divan was replaced by a military commission. To negate the effects of the Great Lord's firman, the French posted a proclamation in all the cities of Egypt under their control, ending in the words:

Stop founding your hopes on Ibrahim and Mourad, and put your trust in he who has empires in his discretion and who creates men!

== Sources ==
- Chandler, David G. (1966). The Campaigns of Napoleon. New York: Macmillan. ISBN 978-0025236608.
- Pigeard, Alain (2004). Dictionnaire des batailles de Napoléon: 1796-1815, Paris: éditions Tallandier. ISBN 978-2-84734-073-0
