= Dominique Martin Dupuy =

French revolutionary brigadier general

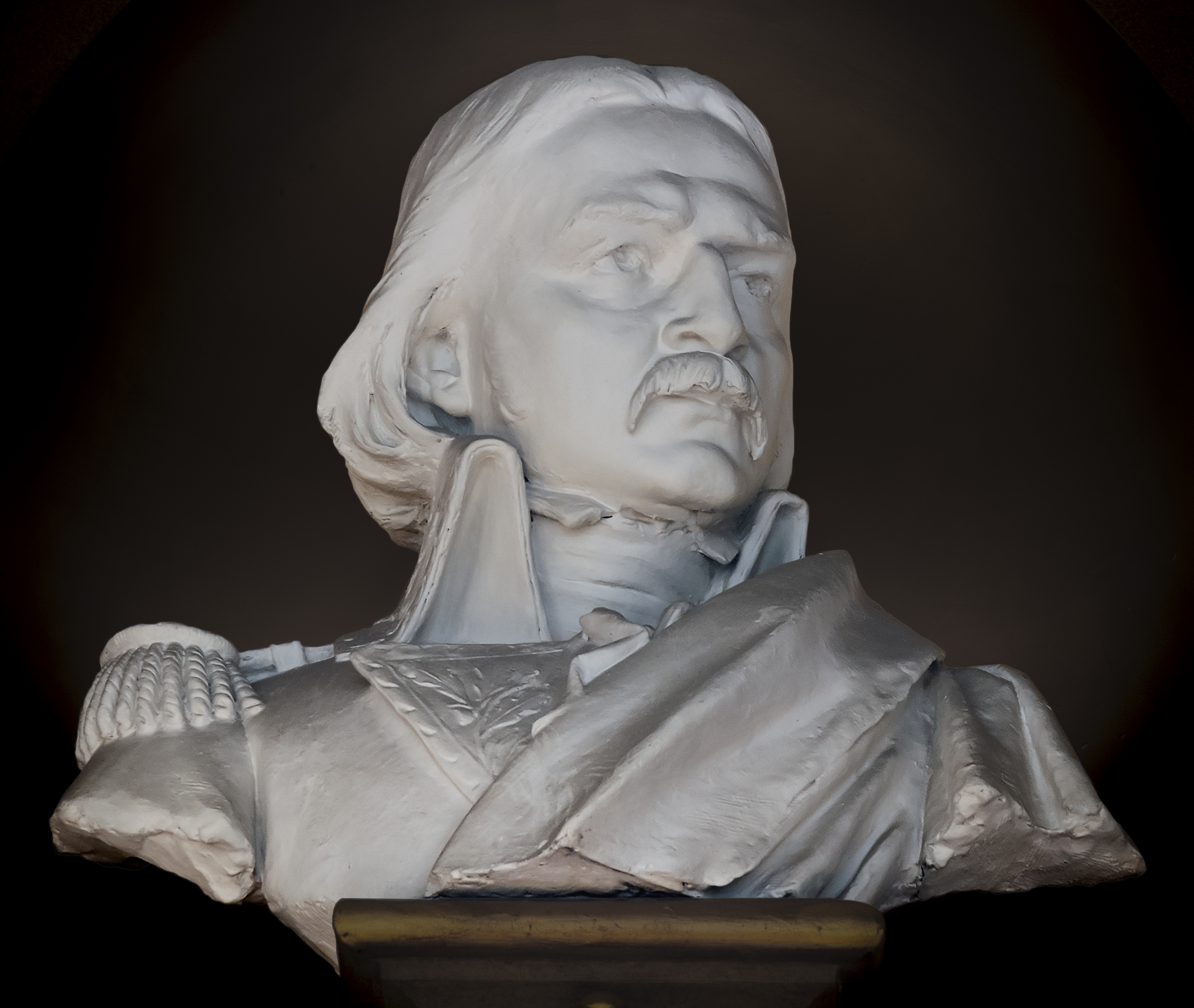
- Bust of General Dupuy at the Capitole de Toulouse
- Born: 8 February 1767; Toulouse, France
- Died: 21 October 1798 (aged 31); Cairo, Ottoman Egypt
- Military career
- Allegiance: Kingdom of France; Kingdom of the French; French First Republic
- Service years: 1789–1798
- Rank: Brigadier General
- Conflicts: French Revolutionary Wars

Dominique Martin Dupuy (8 February 1767 – 21 October 1798) was a French revolutionary brigadier general.

The son of a baker from Toulouse, he engaged in the Régiment d'Artois before the French Revolution. In 1791, he was volunteer in the 1st battalion of the Haute-Garonne regiment, where he was soon elected junior lieutenant-colonel. He took part in the repression of royalist insurrections in Ardèche, then joined the Army of Italy, distinguishing himself at the battle of Lonato, where he commanded the 32nd Line Infantry Demi-brigade. Military governor of Milan in 1797, he accompanied Napoleon Bonaparte in the expedition to Egypt, where he wrote, shortly after Pope Pius VI's death : "We are fooling Egyptians with our pretended interest for their religion; neither Bonaparte nor we believe in this religion more than we did in Pius the Defunct's one". (Note: “Nous trompons les Égyptiens par notre simili attachement à leur religion, à laquelle Bonaparte et nous ne croyons pas plus qu'à celle de Pie le défunt.”) He was struck with a lance during the Revolt of Cairo, where he was brought to Jean-Andoche Junot's house, but died two hours later. Napoleon later named one of the forts in Egypt after Dupuy. He had never ceased to correspond with the Jacobins from Toulouse.
