= Charles Dugua =

French Army officer

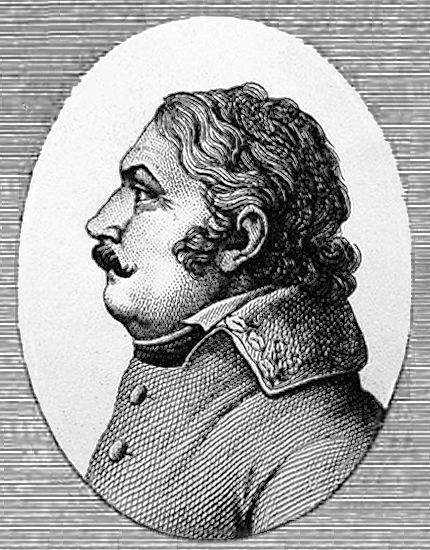
Portrait of Dugua

Charles François Joseph Dugua (1 March 1744 – 16 October 1802) was a French Army officer who served in the French Revolutionary Wars.

== Military career ==
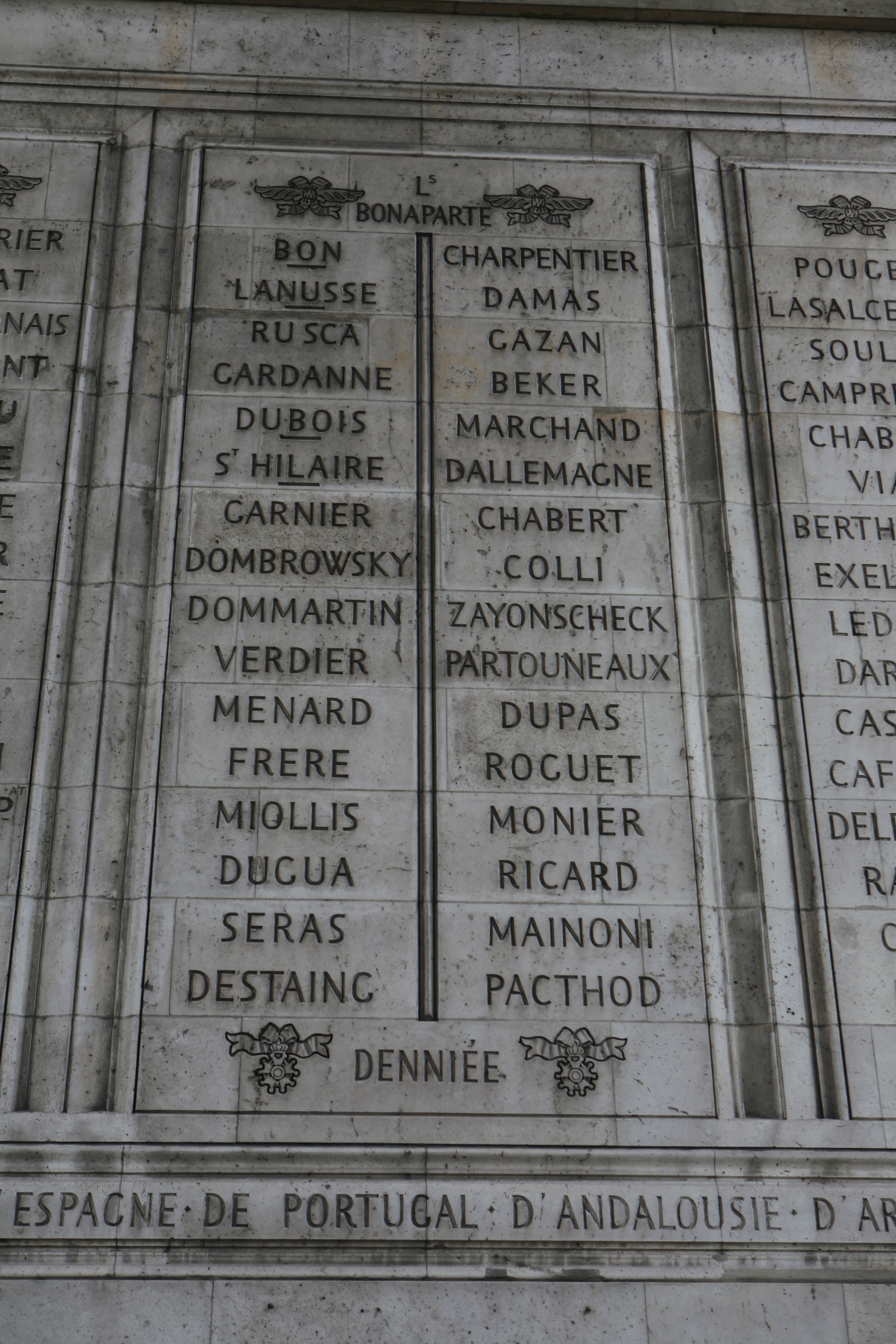
Dugua's name on the Arc de Triomphe

Dugua was in charge of Napoleon's fifth division during the French invasion of Egypt and Syria, replacing the wounded General Kléber. He was sent by Napoleon to El Rahmaniya (Rahmanié) with Joachim Murat, stopping at Rosetta on the way. On 6 July 1798, Napoleon in a letter stated that Dugua was present in Rosetta. Later during the uprising in Cairo, Dugua was responsible for the execution and decapitation of over 3000 Egyptians.

He died during the Battle of Crête-à-Pierrot, which was a major battle of the Haitian Revolution. His is one of the names inscribed under the Arc de Triomphe.
