= Pierre-François Bouchard =

French Army officer and engineer

- Born: 29 April 1771; Orgelet, France
- Died: 5 August 1822 (aged 51); Givet, France
- Education: École polytechnique
- Occupations: Army officer, military engineer
- Known for: The discovery of the Rosetta Stone
- Spouse: Marie Élisabeth Bergere
- Parents: Pierre Bouchard; Pierrette Janet de Cressia
- Military career
- Allegiance: French First Republic; First French Empire; Kingdom of France
- Branch: French Revolutionary Army; French Imperial Army; French Royal Army
- Service years: 1793–1822
- Rank: Engineer in chief
- Conflicts: Napoleonic Wars

Pierre-François Bouchard (29 April 1771 – 5 August 1822) was a French Army officer and engineer. He is most famous for discovering the Rosetta Stone, an important archaeological find that allowed Ancient Egyptian writing to be understood for the first time in over a millennium.

== Life ==
=== Early life ===
He was born in 1771 to Pierre Bouchard (a master joiner, then a businessman, then a merchant and finally a teacher) and his wife Pierrette Janet de Cressia, the youngest of their four daughters and three sons, all born in Orgelet (Jura). Pierre-François studied in the college in Orgelet up until the classe de rhétorique, then spent two years studying philosophy and mathematics in the college at Besançon. His military career began in 1793 as a sergeant-major in a battalion of the Grenadiers de Paris. He was one of these famous "soldiers of Year II" and fought in Champagne and Belgium, before being sent to the École Nationale d' Aérostatique in 1794. He was made lieutenant des aérostiers (French for 'lieutenant of aeronautics') and taught maths as deputy director of this school, then based in the Chateau de Meudon. There his right eye was badly damaged when a gas flask exploded during an experiment to produce hydrogen gas to inflate observation balloons – the experiment was led by Nicolas-Jacques Conté, who lost his left eye. Conté held Bouchard in very high esteem and recommended him to Claude Louis Berthollet, one of the four founding fathers of the École polytechnique, which Bouchard entered on 21 November 1796. There he studied descriptive geometry under Gaspard Monge and learned the art of fortification, until his studies were interrupted when he was taken on by the Ministry of War and attached as a lieutenant to the Egyptian expeditionary force on 20 April 1798.

=== Egypt ===
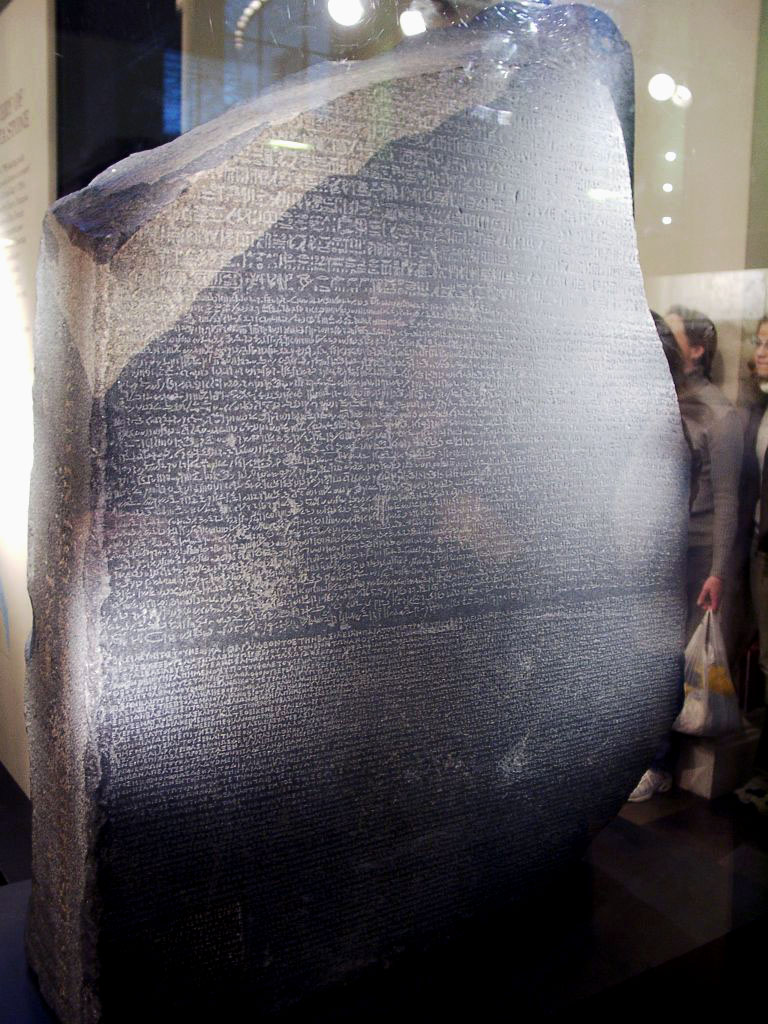
The Rosetta Stone, now in the British Museum, discovered by Pierre-François Bouchard in July 1799

Before embarking for Egypt, he married Marie Élisabeth Bergere on 23 April 1798 – she was a young woman from Meudon, five years his junior, with whom he much later had two children. He then went to Toulon and on 19 May the same year boarded the Franklin. He landed in Egypt on 4 July after the capture of Alexandria and was then made a member of the Commission des Sciences et des Arts. Still under Conté's command, he was attached to a group of mechanical artists and ordered to investigate Egyptian crafts and techniques. He left Alexandria for Cairo on 7 September and, after a few weeks in Cairo, was on 3 October put under Antoine-François Andréossy's command as part of a team of geographers sent to investigate Lake Manzala between Damietta and Port Said. Bouchard was only on this mission for forty days before going before the exit-panel of the École polytechnique presided over by Monge, graduating in mid November. He was then promoted to engineer lieutenant, second class on 28 November 1798 and left the Commission to train in the army.

He was then put in charge of rebuilding of Fort Julien, an old Mamluk fortification near the port city of Rosetta (present-day Rashid) which Bonaparte had renamed after Thomas Prosper Jullien, recently assassinated in Egypt. During these works he discovered the Rosetta Stone on 15 or 19 July 1799. He was immediately convinced of its importance, an enthusiasm he passed on to generals Menou and Bonaparte. He found himself caught up in the fiasco which led to the Siege and fall of the fort of El-Arish, which he and general Cazals were defending against the Ottomans. He was sent as an envoy to the Grand Vizier but was arrested, disarmed and imprisoned in Damascus for forty-two days. On his release he was promoted to Captain on 1 May 1800 and attached again to the force at Rosetta, where he was again captured when the small French garrison Fort Jullien had to capitulate to the 2,000 British and 4,000 Ottoman troops sent against them. He was released at the end of the war in Egypt and got back to Marseille on 30 July 1801.

=== Saint Domingue and Spain ===
At Marseille he joined the Saint-Domingue expedition, embarking in December accompanied by his wife, who came with him at her own expense in imitation of Pauline Bonaparte, wife of the expedition's commander Leclerc. Bouchard and his wife both caught yellow fever on the island, though she was repatriated and gave birth to their daughter in 1802, without Bouchard receiving news until much later. Bouchard was captured on the island's surrender and interned on Jamaica before being released on parole in August 1804, after which he went back to France. He convalesced there for a few months before joining Napoleon in September 1805, upon which Bouchard was put in charge of construction works in the town of Vendée (later renamed La Roche-sur-Yon), which Napoleon had founded to reestablish civil and military authority on a civilian population who he thought might be encouraged to resume the War in the Vendée by the British naval presence in the area. Bouchard was in the town for two years with his wife, who gave birth to a son.

After a brief stay in La Rochelle, in 1807 Bouchard joined an expeditionary force which Napoleon was sending against Spain and Portugal after the Treaties of Tilsit. Bouchard then spent seven years in the Peninsular War under Dupont, Marshall Soult, Marshal Masséna and Marshal Marmont, fighting bravely at the Battle of Alcolea Bridge on the Guadalquivir. Even so, after Dupont's surrender at the Battle of Baylen on 22 July 1808, Bouchard was yet again captured. When he was released he went to join Soult's army and was present at the Battle of Corunna and the First Battle of Porto. During the Battle of the Brdige of Amarante, upon discovering that the Portuguese had placed mines along the fortified bridge, he distinguished himself at the head of the sappers by suggesting an explosion on the French side to sever the cord without exploding the mine, to allow for a sudden assault. Following his suggestion, the French troops were able to successfully storm the bridge and capture ten guns in the Portuguese batteries, and several hundred prisoners.

He was promoted to Major on 24 November 1809, but left his wife in such great want she had to beg for an advance of 500 French francs from his pay, which he had otherwise entirely devoted to buying equipment and new horses after the French pulled out of Portugal. In 1810 and 1811 he fought under Massena in a new expedition to Portugal, which once again ended in retreat. He was made a Knight of the Légion d'Honneur and attached to the defense of Astorga in Spain under the command of Marmont then Clauzel. There he was again captured on the city's surrender and sent to England in September 1812, leaving his children and his parents in the care of his wife, who was again impoverished now she did not have his income.

=== Restoration ===
Bouchard only got back to France after the Treaty of Paris in July 1814 and the Bourbon Restoration saw him made an Officer of the Légion d'Honneur, a Knight of the order of Saint Louis and chief engineer of Orléans. During the Hundred Days he sided with Napoleon, who put him in charge of defending Laon. He was denounced after the Battle of Waterloo for this action and put on half-pay, until requesting in July 1816 that his service record be amended to play down his actions during the Hundred Days. He thus rejoined the army and was attached to the fortified cities in northern France.

His classmate Prevost de Vernois recommended him for the rank of lieutenant colonel, but he died in Givet in 1822, as Engineer in Chief there, after a long and painful illness – his daughter died just before him, aged 13. His widow's friends convinced the King to grant her a 450 F pension, only a quarter of the pension Bouchard himself had received.

== Bibliography ==
- (in French) La chute d'El-Arich, décembre 1799 : Journal historique du Capitaine Bouchard, preface and notes by Gaston Wiet, éditions de la Revue du Caire, 1945, 176 pages.
- (in French) La pierre du lieutenant inconnu, Frédéric Chevalier, Pays Comtois n°73 ISSN 1266-1341, Juillet 2007, pp. 86–87.
