= George Ramsay, 9th Earl of Dalhousie =

British Army officer and colonial administrator (1770–1838)

General The Right Honourable The Earl of Dalhousie GCB
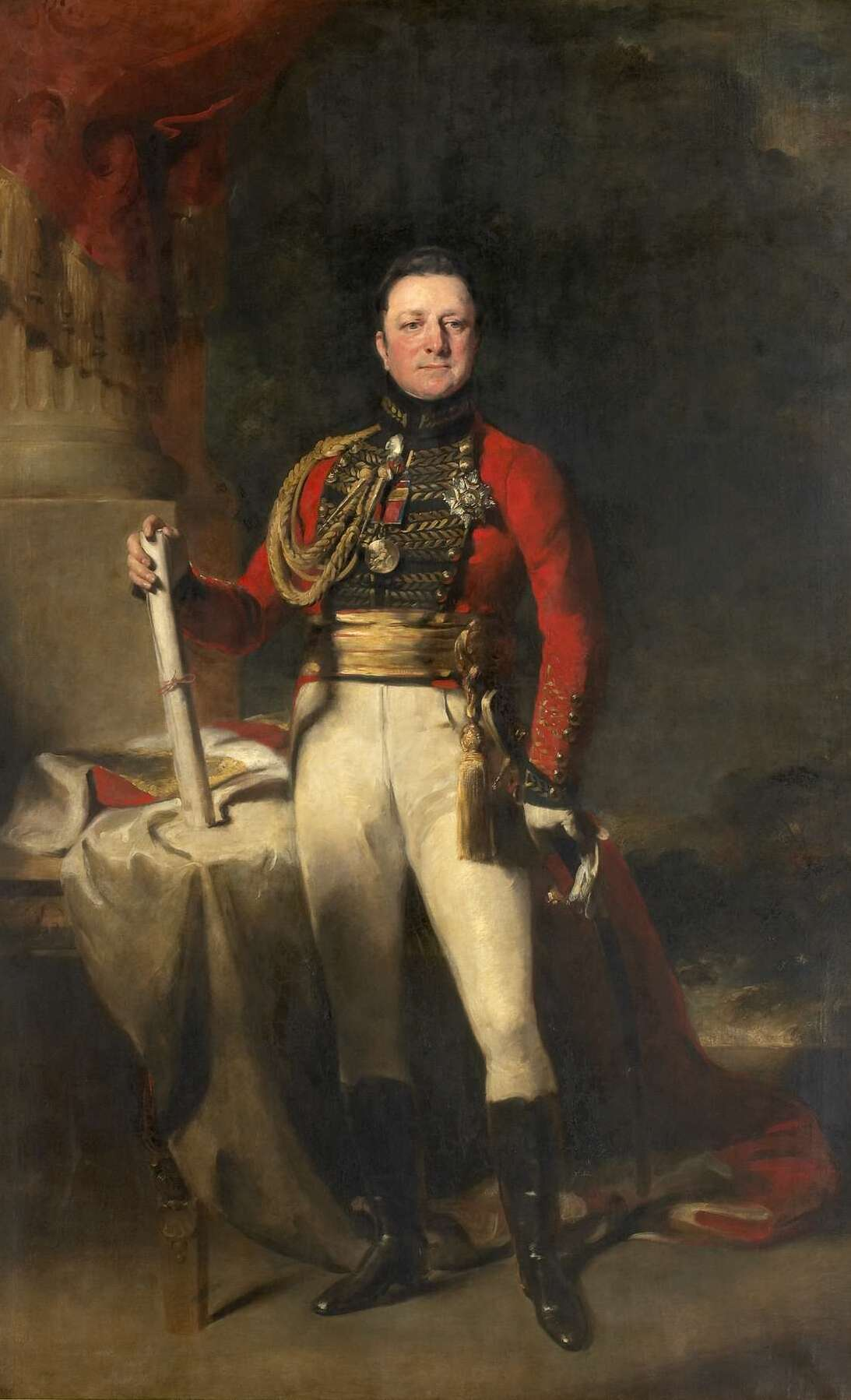
- Portrait by John Watson Gordon, 1829

Governor of Nova Scotia
- In office 1816–1820
- Monarch: George III
- Preceded by: George Stracey Smyth
- Succeeded by: Sir James Kempt

Governor General of British North America
- In office 1820–1828
- Monarch: George IV
- Preceded by: The Duke of Richmond
- Succeeded by: Sir James Kempt

Commander-in-Chief, India
- In office 1830–1832
- Monarch: William IV
- Preceded by: The Viscount Combermere
- Succeeded by: Sir Edward Barnes

Personal details
- Born: 23 October 1770 Dalhousie Castle, Midlothian
- Died: 21 March 1838 (aged 67) Dalhousie Castle, Midlothian
- Spouse: Christian Broun
- Children: 3
- Parents: George Ramsay, 8th Earl of Dalhousie; Elizabeth Glen
- Education: University of Edinburgh

Military service
- Allegiance: Great Britain; United Kingdom
- Branch/service: British Army
- Years of service: 1788–1838
- Rank: General
- Unit: 3rd Dragoons; 1st Regiment of Foot; 2nd Regiment of Foot
- Commands: 7th Division; 26th Regiment of Foot
- Battles/wars: French Revolutionary Wars; Battle of Martinique (1794); Irish Rebellion of 1798; Anglo-Russian invasion of Holland; French invasion of Egypt and Syria; Siege of Fort Julien; Napoleonic Wars; Peninsular War; Battle of Vitoria; Battle of the Pyrenees

General George Ramsay, 9th Earl of Dalhousie, GCB (23 October 1770 – 21 March 1838), styled Lord Ramsay until 1787, was a British Army officer and colonial administrator who served as the Governor General of British North America from 1820 to 1828. Serving in the British army during the French Revolutionary and Napoleonic Wars, he also served as the governor of Nova Scotia from 1816 to 1820 and Commander-in-Chief, India from 1830 to 1832.

== Background and education ==
Dalhousie was born at Dalhousie Castle, Midlothian, the son of George Ramsay, 8th Earl of Dalhousie, and Elizabeth, daughter of Andrew Glen. He was educated at the Royal High School, Edinburgh, and the University of Edinburgh.

== Military career ==
After his father's death in 1787, Dalhousie joined the British Army in July 1788 by purchasing a cornet's commission in the 3rd Dragoons, and was later appointed as captain of a new regimental troop he personally raised. Dalhousie transferred to the 2nd Battalion of the 1st Regiment of Foot in January 1791 and purchased the rank of major in the 2nd Regiment of Foot in June 1792. He travelled with the regiment to Martinique as its commander and became the regimental lieutenant colonel in August 1794. He was severely wounded in 1795 and returned to Britain. He served in the suppression of the Irish Rebellion of 1798 and in 1799 took part in the Anglo-Russian invasion of Holland. He was promoted to brevet colonel in January 1800, and fought in the later stages of the Egyptian campaign under Ralph Abercromby, capturing Rosetta without a fight and successfully investing the nearby Fort Julien in April 1801. In 1803 he was promoted to brigadier general and appointed to the Army's staff in Scotland, and was promoted against to major general in April 1805.

During the later stages of the Peninsular War Dalhousie commanded the 7th Division under the Duke of Wellington. Wellington was sometimes critical of his performance, as during the retreat from Burgos, because of his tardy arrival at Vitoria, and for his misinformation about French intentions shortly before the Battle of Roncesvalles.

With Henry Clinton and William Stewart he displayed insubordination during the retreat from Burgos. Wellington ordered them down a certain road, but they decided it "was too long and too wet and chose another. This brought them to a bridge which was blocked so that they could not cross. Here, eventually, Wellington found them, waiting. What, Wellington was asked, did he say to them? 'Oh by God, it was too serious to say anything.' 'What a situation is mine!' he complained to London later. 'It is impossible to prevent incapable men from being sent to the army.'".

At Vitoria he was delayed because he "had found difficulty in marching through the broken country", though Thomas Picton arrived early enough and attacked in his stead when the 7th Division failed to appear.

He was nevertheless voted the thanks of Parliament for his services at Vitoria where he commanded the Left Center Column, consisting of the 3rd and 7th Divisions. He was promoted to lieutenant-general and appointed colonel of the 26th Regiment of Foot in 1813. He led his division in the Battle of the Pyrenees where it was lightly engaged, then went home to England in October. After the previous commander was wounded at the Battle of Orthez in February 1814, Dalhousie briefly led the 7th Division again. He occupied the city of Bordeaux and thus missed the final Battle of Toulouse.

William Kemley was said to have saved the life of Ramsay in battle, by holding a flag over his body. In doing so he suffered a wound from a musket ball that left him with a permanent hole in the palm of his hand. His grandson, Peter Gordon Kemley, used to tell how he could put his finger through the palm of his grandfather's hand. For his actions, William Kemley was given a house on the Dalhousie Estate at Brechin Castle, rent-free for life. His daughter, Caroline Kemley, was born under a gun carriage the evening before the Battle of Quatre Bras. Her mother was one of six wives per regiment permitted to accompany their husbands.

== Later career ==
In 1815 he was created Baron Dalhousie, of Dalhousie Castle in Midlothian, in the peerage of the United Kingdom, to allow him to sit in the House of Lords by right (until that point he had sat as a Scottish representative peer).

=== Lieutenant Governor of Nova Scotia ===
According to the Dictionary of Canadian Biography Ramsay sought a position in colonial administration to pay debts he incurred expanding his estate. He replaced Sir John Coape Sherbrooke as Lieutenant Governor of Nova Scotia in 1816. He is known to have employed an official draughtsman, John Elliott Woolford, known for many surviving drawings and paintings.

Ramsay created Dalhousie College in Halifax, Nova Scotia, which grew into Dalhousie University.

=== Governor-General of Canada ===
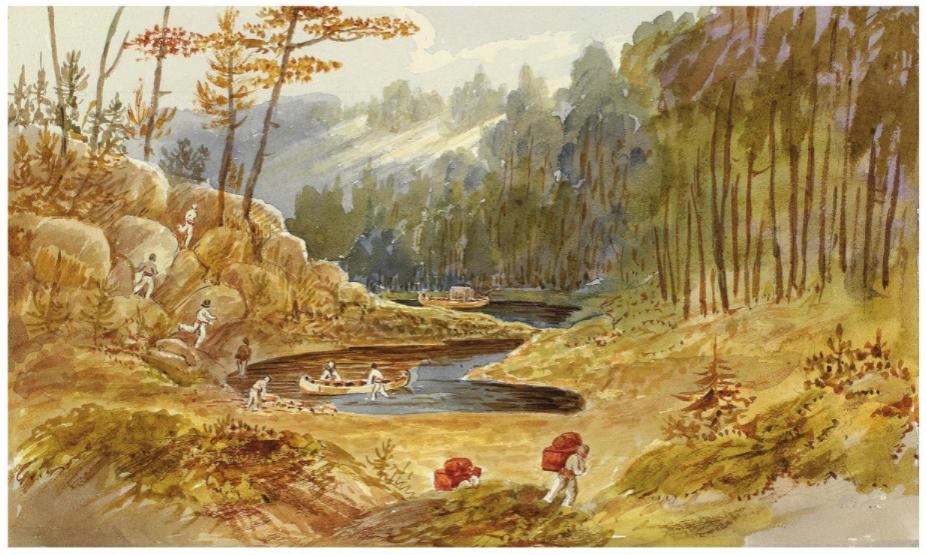
When Ramsay was made Governor-General of Canada he toured both Upper and Lower Canada, including what was then distant wilderness. This painting shows his expedition portaging at what is now North Bay, Ontario.

He was appointed Governor-General of British North America in 1820 and held that position until 1828. Aside from the Catholic Church, Ramsay is considered the first true art collector in nineteenth century Quebec City. In the Art Canada Institute's 2025 publication Quebec City Art & Artists: An Illustrated History, author Michèle Grandbois writes about Ramsay's time in Canada and his connection to the arts in Quebec City.

=== Commander in Chief of India ===
Dalhousie was appointed Commander-in-Chief of the Indian Army in 1828. Army headquarters alternated between Calcutta and Simla. India taxed his health, and he resigned in 1832.

=== Retirement ===
Dalhousie suffered a "fainting fit" in February 1833. His health continued to deteriorate, and he returned to his estate, in 1834, where his health continued to deteriorate until his death 4 years later. He went both blind and senile in his final years.

== Family ==
Lord Dalhousie married Christian, daughter of Charles Broun, of Colstoun in East Lothian, Scotland, a lady of gentle extraction and distinguished gifts, in 1805. She was recognised as a "zealous botanist" by leading scientists of her day.

Ramsay and Christian had three sons, the two elder of whom died early. He died at Dalhousie Castle in March 1838, aged 67, and was succeeded by his youngest son, James, who was later created Marquess of Dalhousie. Lady Dalhousie died in January 1839.

Lord Dalhousie's family name is pronounced 'dal-How-zee' except when referring to the Port Dalhousie ward of St. Catharines, Ontario, pronounced locally as 'dal-OO-zee'. Likewise, Dalhousie Street in Brantford, Ontario and the former Dalhousie Ward in Ottawa are often pronounced locally as 'dal-HOO-zee'. It is said that this is a result of the accent of the Scottish sailors and shipbuilders who frequented the Port's establishments (Dalhousie, himself a Scot, used the more upper class English-sounding pronunciation).

== Legacy ==
While serving as Lieutenant-Governor of Nova Scotia he founded Dalhousie University in Halifax, Nova Scotia. The town of Dalhousie, New Brunswick was named after him when he visited there in 1826, although his diary entry for the day stated that he disapproved of changing the original French and Mi'kmaq location names. The villages of East and West Dalhousie in Nova Scotia are named after him, as are Earltown and Port Dalhousie, which is part of St. Catharines, Ontario, a community in Calgary Alberta, Dalhousie Station and an adjacent square, Dalhousie Square in Montreal.

== See also ==
- List of universities named after people
- Grandbois, Michèle. Quebec City Art & Artists: An Illustrated History, 2025. Toronto: Art Canada Institute.

Masonic offices
Preceded by The Earl of Aboyne	Grand Master of the Grand Lodge of Scotland; 1804–1806	Succeeded by The Duke of Rothesay
Political offices
Preceded by George Stracey Smyth (acting)	Lieutenant Governor of Nova Scotia; 1816–1820	Succeeded by Sir James Kempt
Preceded by The Duke of Richmond	Governor General of British North America; 1820–1828	Succeeded by Sir James Kempt
Military offices
Preceded by The Lord Elphinstone	Colonel of the 26th (Cameronian) Regiment of Foot; 1813–1838	Succeeded by Sir John Colborne
Preceded by The Viscount Combermere	Commander-in-Chief, India; 1830–1832	Succeeded by Sir Edward Barnes
Peerage of Scotland
Preceded by George Ramsay	Earl of Dalhousie; 1787–1838	Succeeded by James Broun-Ramsay
Peerage of the United Kingdom
New creation	Baron Dalhousie; 1815–1838	Succeeded by James Broun-Ramsay
