= Aunou =

Aunou may refer to two communes in France:

- Aunou-le-Faucon, in the Orne department
- Aunou-sur-Orne, in the Orne department
