= Battle of the Nile (disambiguation) =

Battle of the Nile was a victory by Nelson in 1798.

Battle of the Nile may also refer to:

- Battle of the Delta, a victory by Rameses III around 1175 BC
- Battle of the Nile (47 BC), a victory by Caesar and Cleopatra
- The Battle of the Nile (painting), an 1800 painting by Philip James de Loutherbourg

== See also ==
- Battle of Abukir (disambiguation)
