= Citadel of Qaitbay =

Building in Alexandria, Egypt

Coordinates: 31.2130°N 29.8852°E

Citadel of Qaitbay قلعة قايتباي
- Pharos island, Alexandria, Egypt
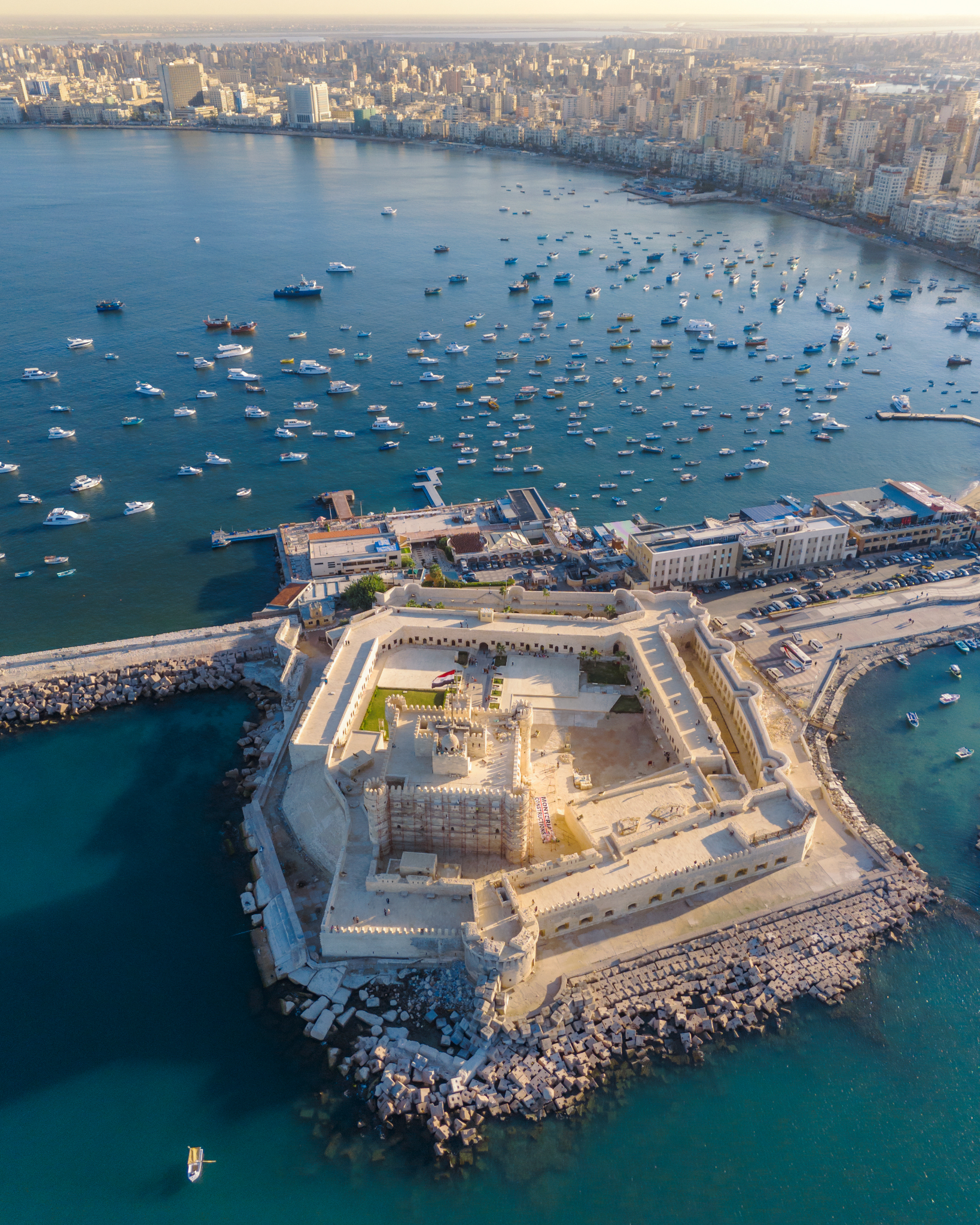
- Aerial view of the citadel

Site information
- Type: Mamluk citadel
- Condition: Intact; converted into a Maritime Museum

Location
- Height: 17 metres (56 ft)

Site history
- Built: 1477; 549 years ago; 1805 (renovations); 1984 (restorations)
- Built by: Qaitbay (1477); Muhammad Ali Pasha (1805); Egyptian Antiquities Organization (1984)
- Demolished: 1882 (severely damaged during the Bombardment of Alexandria)
- Events: Orabi Revolt, Bombardment of Alexandria

The Citadel of Qaitbay (or the Fort of Qaitbay; Arabic: قلعة قايتباي) is a 15th-century defensive fortress located on the Mediterranean sea coast, on Pharos Island in Alexandria, Egypt. It was built from 1477 to 1479 AD (882–884 AH) by Sultan of Egypt al-Ashraf Sayf al-Din Qaitbay. The Citadel is situated on the eastern side of the northern tip of Pharos Island at the mouth of the Alexandria Port.

== History ==
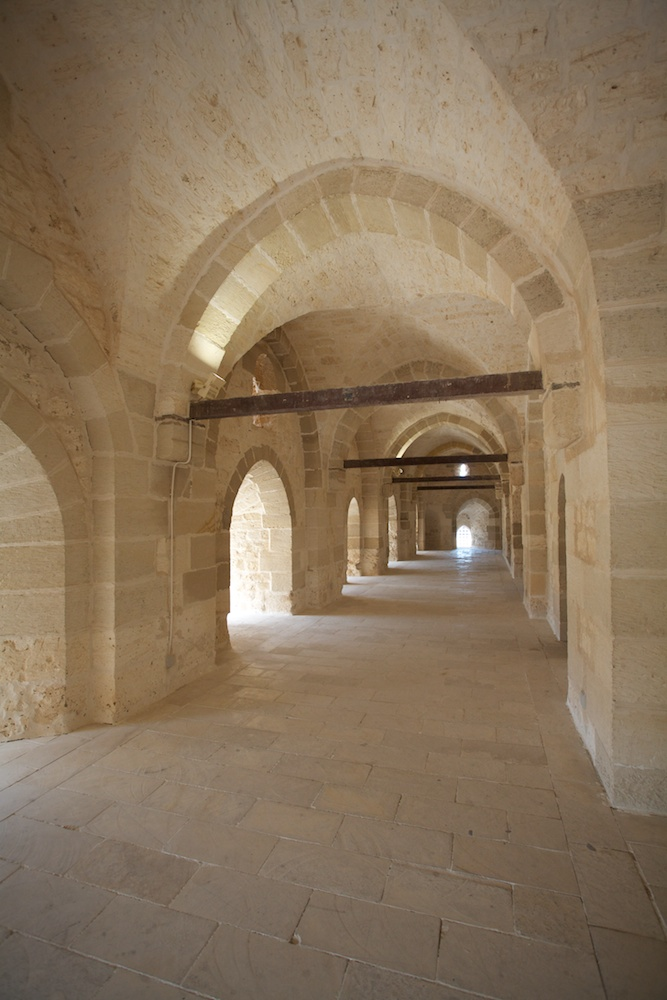
Hallway in Citadel of Qaitbay

The Qaitbay Citadel in Alexandria is considered one of the most important defensive strongholds, not only in Egypt, but also along the Mediterranean Sea coast. It formulated an important part of the fortification system of Alexandria in the 15th century AD.

=== Lighthouse of Alexandria ===
The Citadel is situated at the entrance of the eastern harbour on the eastern point of Pharos Island. It was erected on the site of the former Lighthouse of Alexandria, which was one of the Seven Wonders of the Ancient World. Many structural modifications were made to the lighthouse after the Arab conquest of Egypt, but the lighthouse continued to function for many centuries. Restoration began in the period of Ahmad ibn Tulun (about 880 AD). During the 11th century an earthquake occurred, causing damage to the octagonal part. The bottom survived, but it could only serve as a watchtower, and a small mosque was built on the top. Two very destructive earthquakes occurred in 1303 and 1323, which resulted in the complete destruction of the lighthouse.

=== 15th-century fortifications ===
About 1480, the Circassian Mamluk Sultan al-Ashraf Qaitbay fortified the place as part of his coastal defensive edifices against the Turks, who were threatening Egypt at that time. He built the fortress and placed a mosque inside it. The Citadel continued to function during most of the Mamluk period, the Ottoman period and the Modern period, but after the British bombardment of Alexandria in 1882, it was kept out of the spotlight. It became neglected until the 20th century, when it was restored several times by the Egyptian Supreme Council of Antiquities.

=== The edifice's mason ===
Qaitbay was so fond of art and architecture that he created an important post among the administrative system of the state; it was the Edifices Mason (Shady Al-Ama'er). He built many beneficial constructions in Mecca, Medina, and Jerusalem. In Egypt there are about 70 renovated edifices attributed to him, among them are mosques, Madrasas, agencies, Fountain houses (Sabils), Kuttabs, houses, military edifices like the Citadels in Alexandria and Rosetta (Nowadays the city of Rashid). These Citadels were built to protect the north of Egypt, mainly against the Ottomans, whose power was increasing in the Mediterranean.

Qagmas al-Eshaqy, the edifices mason, was the architect of the Citadel. Before his arrival in Egypt he was a Mamluk of Djakmaq in Syria. During the rule of Qaitbay he became the edifices mason, and then the viceroy of Alexandria. He was appointed governor of Syria (Damascus), built a mosque outside the gate of Rashid (Bab Rashid) as well as a cenotaph and a khan. He also renovated the Mosque of El-Sawary outside the gate of Sadrah (Bab Sadrah).

Qagmas was intelligent and modest, as well as the overseer of many constructions during the time of Qaitbay. In 882 AH (1477 AD) the Sultan Qaitbay visited the site of the old lighthouse in Alexandria and ordered a fortress to be built on its foundations. The construction lasted about 2 years, and it is said that Qaitbay spent more than a hundred thousand gold dinars for the work on the Citadel.

=== Construction ===
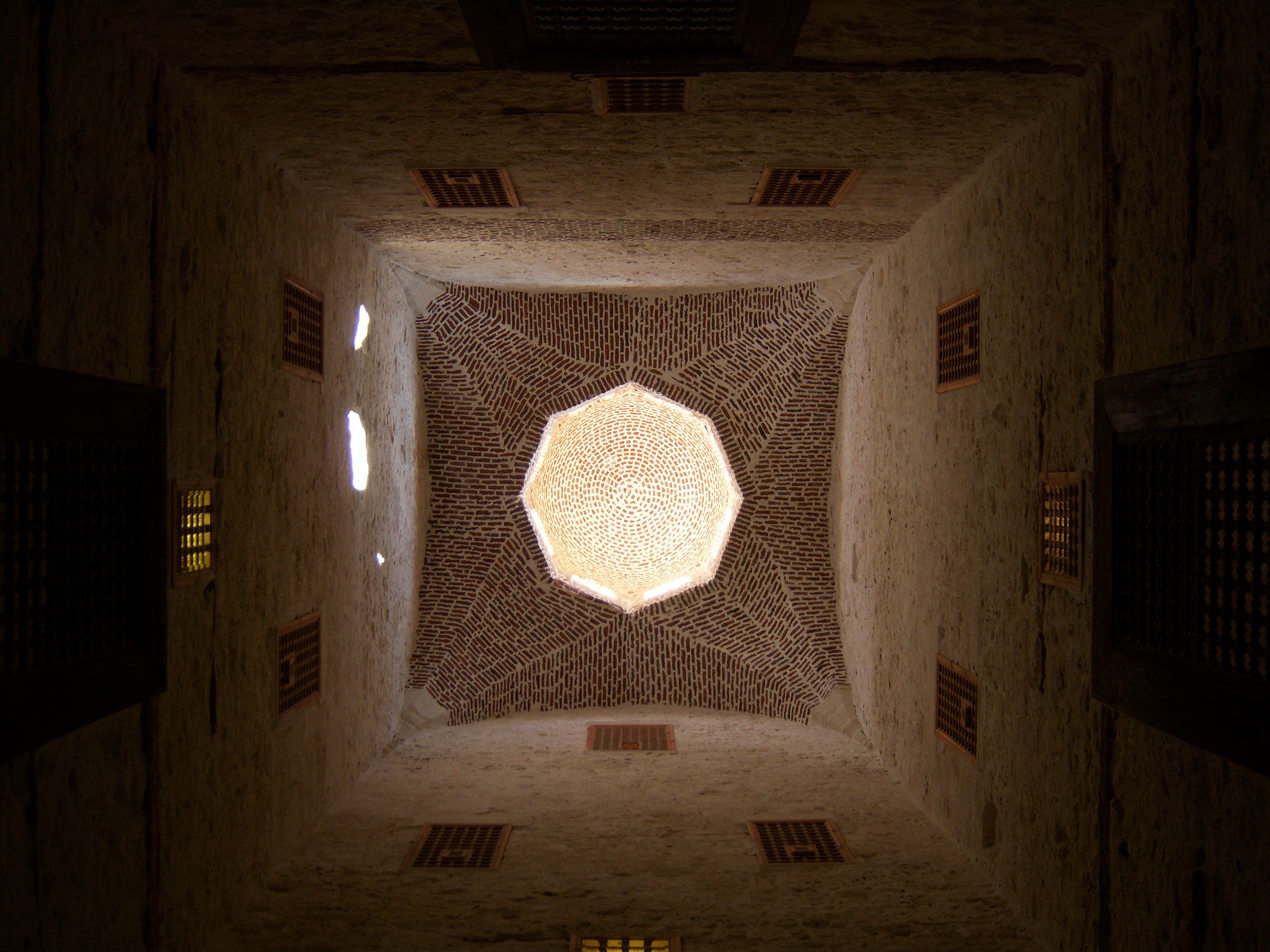
Ceiling in Qaitbay Citadel, Alexandria

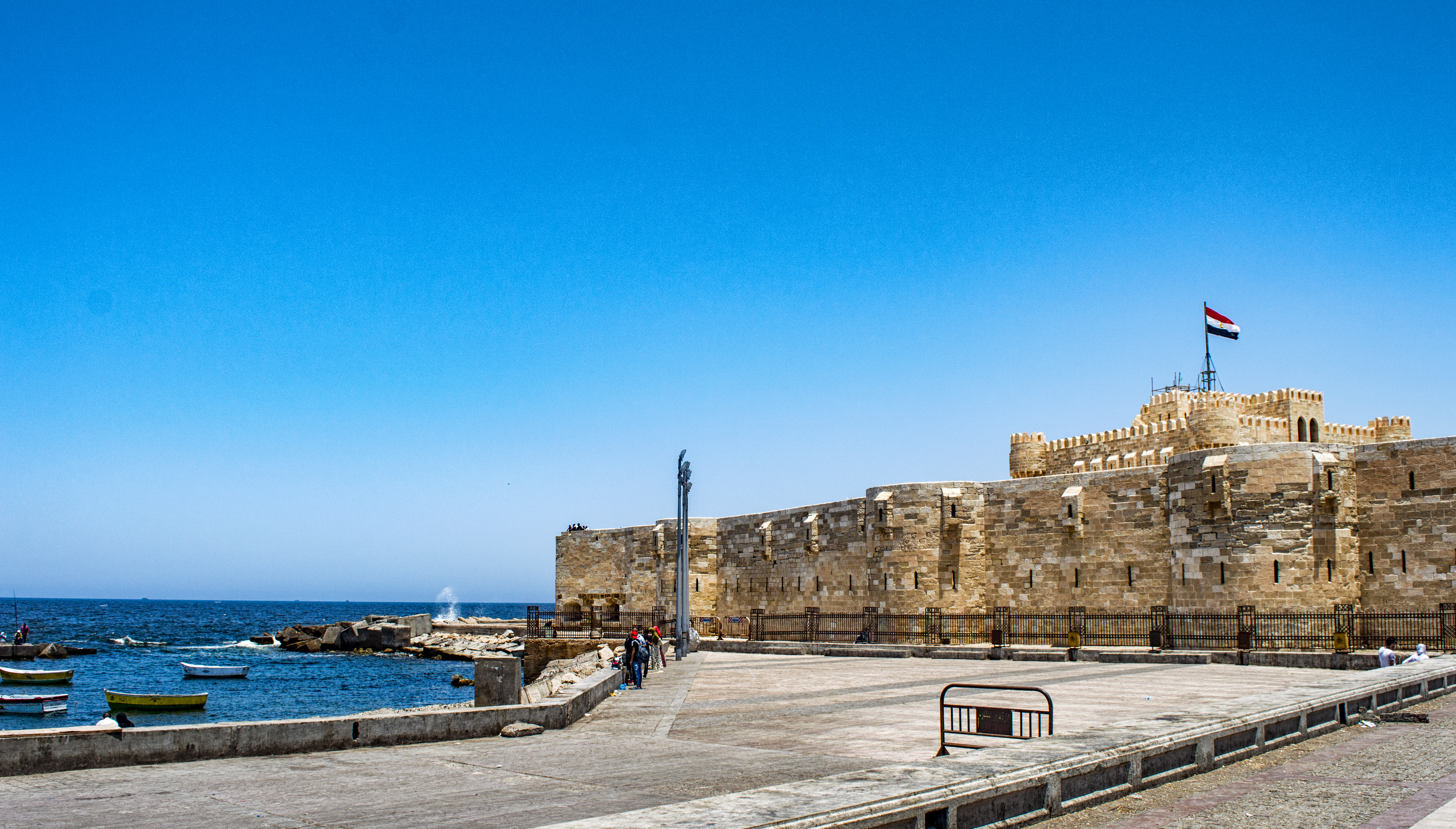
Side view of Qaitbay Citadel

Ibn Ayas mentioned that building of this fort started in the month of Rabi Alawal 882 AH. He said that the Sultan Qaitbay travelled to Alexandria, accompanied with some other Mameluke princes, to visit the site of the old lighthouse and during this visit he ordered the building of the Citadel.

In the month of Shaban 884 AH, the Sultan Qaitbay travelled again to Alexandria when the construction was finished. He provided the fort with a brave legion of soldiers and various weapons. He also, as Ibn Ayas mentioned, dedicated several waqfs from which he financed the construction works as well as the salaries of the soldiers.

Throughout the Mameluke period, and due to its strategic location, the Citadel was well maintained by all the rulers who came after Qaitbay.

=== Strengthening of the garrison ===
The Sultan Qansuh al-Ghuri gave the Citadel special attention. He visited it several times and increased the strength of the garrison, providing it with various weapons and equipment. It included a large prison made for the princes and the state-men whom the Sultan kept away from his favour for some reason. In the episodes of the year 960 AH, Qansuh al-Ghouri travelled to Alexandria with other princes.

=== Approach of the Ottoman threat ===
Ghouri went to the Citadel of Qaitbay where he watched some manoeuvres and military training on the defensive weapons of the Citadel of that era. When he felt the approach of the Ottoman threat, he issued a military decree to forbid weapons to be taken out of the Citadel, he even announced that the death penalty would be the punishment to those who try to steal anything from the Citadel, and he ordered the inscription of this decree on a marble slate fixed to the door leading the court. It says: b-ismi-llāhi r-raḥmāni r-raḥīmi بِسْمِ اللهِ الرَّحْمٰنِ الرَّحِيْمِ "In the name of God, the Most Gracious, the Most Merciful".

"A decree by the order of our master, the noble rank, King Al-Ashraf Abou El-Naser Qansoh El-Ghoury, May God eternalise his reign, that no body should take Makahel weapon, gun powder, tools, or any other thing from the noble tower in Alexandria: and any one of the tower party, whether Mameluke, Slaves or Zarad Kashia, who breaks this (decree) and leaves the tower with something will be hanged at the gate of the tower, deserving the curse of God." Dated Rabei Alawal 907 H.

After the Ottoman Turks had conquered Egypt, even they cared for this unique Citadel. They used it for shelter, as they had done with the Citadel of Saladin in Cairo and the Citadels of Damietta, Rosetta, Al Borollos and El-Arish. They kept it in good condition and stationed it with infantry, artillery, a company of drummers and trumpeters, masons and carpenters.

=== The Ottoman threat recedes ===
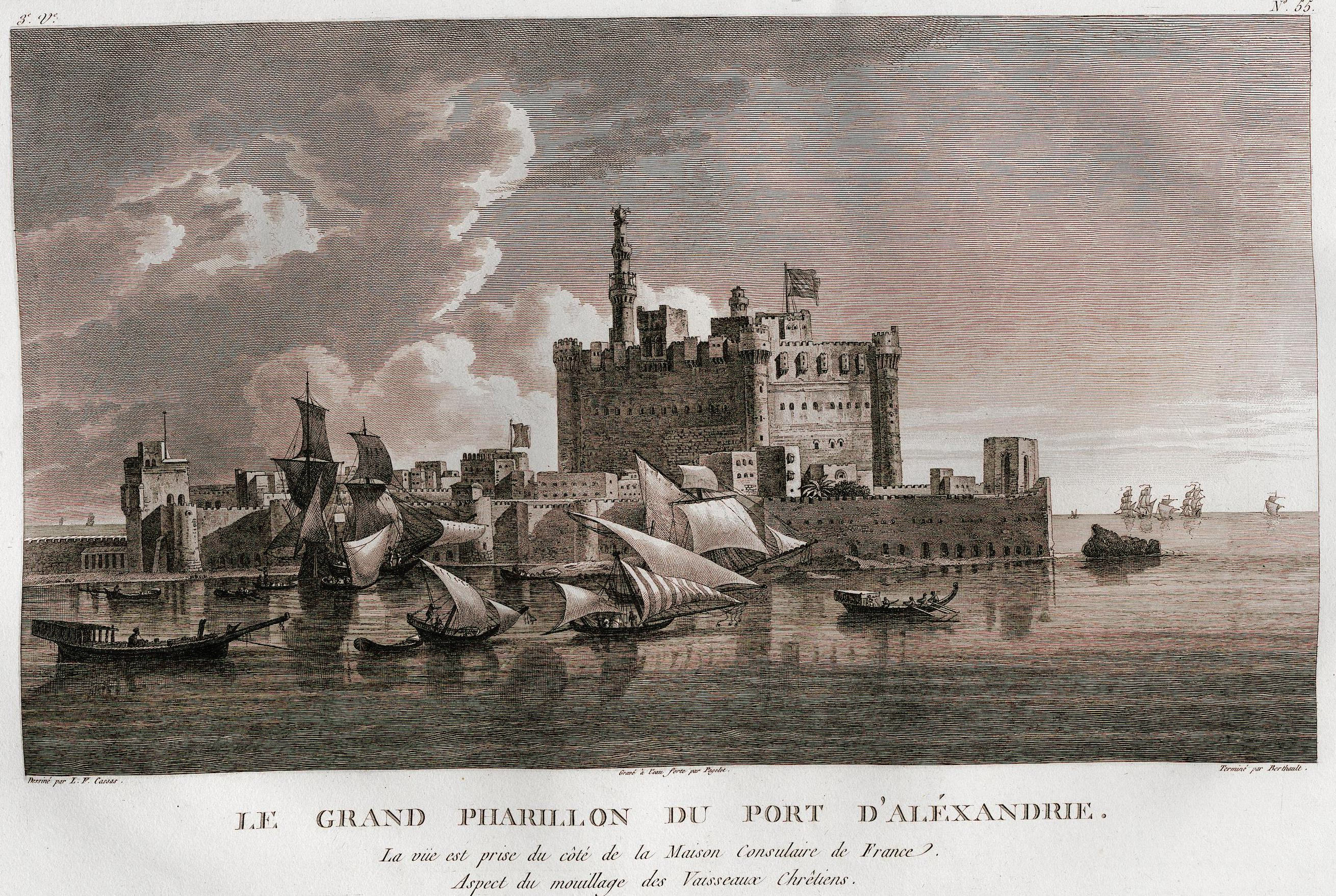
The citadel in the 1780s, by Louis-François Cassas.

As the Ottoman military became weak, the Citadel began to lose its military importance. In 1798 AD, during the French invasion of Egypt, it fell into the hands of the French troops, mainly because of the weakness of the Citadel garrison, and the power of the French modern weapons at that time. Inside, the French found some crusader weapons, which dated back to the campaign of Louis IX. These may have been spoils from the Battle of Al Mansurah.

=== 19th-century renovation ===
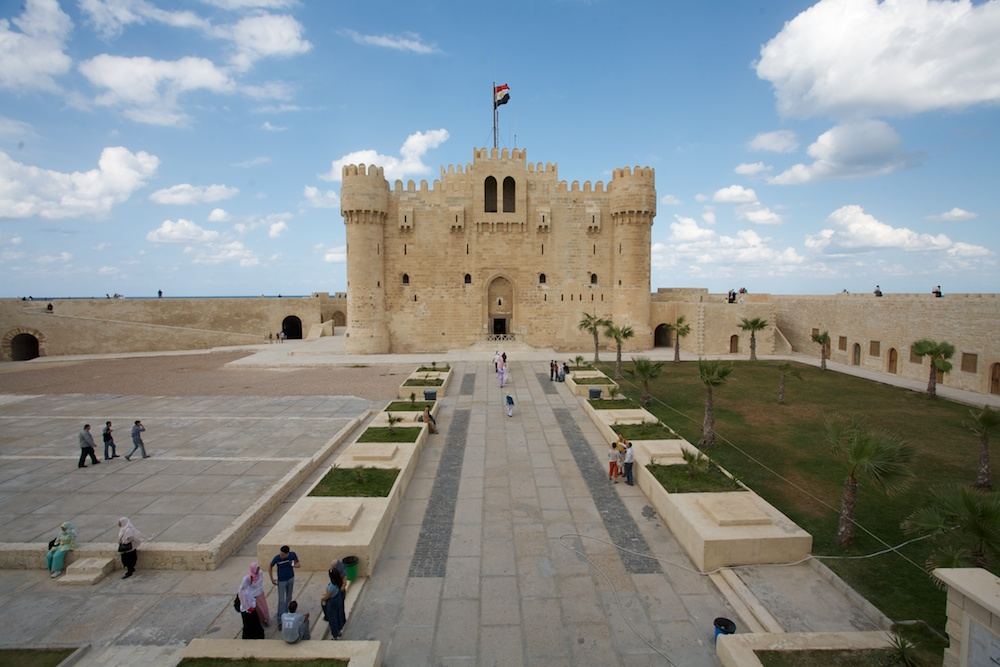
Front view of the Citadel of Qaitbay

When Mohammad Ali Pasha became the ruler of Egypt in 1805, he renovated the old Citadel, restoring and repairing its outer ramparts, and he provided the stronghold with the most modern weapons of the period, particularly the littoral cannons. We can consider the reign of Mohammed Ali as being another golden era for the Citadel.

=== The Orabi revolt ===
The Citadel retained the interest of Mohammed Ali's successors until the year 1882 when the Orabi Revolt took place. The British fleet bombarded Alexandria on 11 July 1882 and damaged a large part of the city, especially in the area of the Citadel. This attack cracked the fortress, causing great damage. The north and western facades were severely damaged as a result of cannon explosions, aimed directly at the structure. The western facade was completely destroyed, leaving large gaps in it.

=== 20th-century renovation ===
The Citadel then remained neglected, until 1904 when the Ministry of Defence restored the Upper floors. King Farouk wanted to turn the Citadel into a royal rest house so he ordered a rapid renovation on it.

After the revolution of 1952 the Egyptian Naval troops turned the building into a Maritime Museum. The biggest restoration work dates to 1984, when the Egyptian Antiquities Organization made ambitious plans to restore the fort.

== See also ==
- Fort Julien, a fortification at Rosetta also built by Qaitbay
