= Administrative divisions of the Mamluk Sultanate =

The administrative divisions of the Mamluk Sultanate were grouped into two sectors, Egypt and the Levant. These major sectors were divided into niyabas (provinces). In Egypt, the niyabas were further divided into ʻamals.

== Terminology ==
Governors of Mamluk provinces were generally called na'ib or na'ib al-saltana (lit. 'na'ib of the sultanate'). In Egypt, this title was originally not used for local governors but solely for the vicegerent (al-na'ib al-kafil), the successor of the vizier. The title of na'ib was granted to the governor of the city of Alexandria in 1365, and during the reign of Barquq (r. 1382–89, 90–99), to the governors of Lower and Upper Egypt. The Egyptian governors additionally bore the inferior titles of kashif or wali.

The na'ibs in Syria held the title malik al-umara (lit. 'king of the emirs'), which continued to be in use after the Ottoman conquest. Despite the literal meaning of this title, the Syrian governors of the Mamluks were subject to administrative control and the word of the sultan.

== List ==
- Egypt:

- Bahri niyaba: It was ruled from Damanhur and encapsulated nearby coastal settlements except for Alexandria, which had its own ruling officials.
  - Damietta Nawahi ʻamal
  - Daqahliyya & Murtahiyya ʻamal
  - Sharqiyah ʻamal
  - Qalyubia ʻamal
  - Fuwa & Muzahmitayn ʻamal
  - Buhayra ʻamal
  - Jazirat Bani Nasr ʻamal
  - Monufia ʻamal
  - Gharbia ʻamal
  - Alexandria Nawahi ʻamal
  - Nastrawiyya ʻamal
- Quebli niyaba: It was ruled from Asyut and controlled Upper Egypt, extending as south as Aswan.
  - Manfalutiyya ʻamal
  - Ashmunein ʻamal
  - Bahnasawiyya ʻamal
  - Fayoumiya ʻamal
  - Atfihiyah ʻamal
  - Jizya ʻamal
  - Qusiya ʻamal
  - Akhmimiya ʻamal
  - Asyutiyya ʻamal
- Cairo wali

- Levant:

- Damascus niyaba
- Aleppo niyaba
- Tripoli niyaba
- Hama niyaba
- Safed niyaba
- Gaza niyaba
- Kerak niyaba
- Hims niyaba
- Jerusalem niyaba

== Bibliography ==
- Ayalon, David (1991). "Mamlūks". In Bosworth, C. E.; van Donzel, E. & Pellat, Ch. (eds.). The Encyclopaedia of Islam, Second Edition. Volume VI: Mahk–Mid. Leiden: E. J. Brill. pp. 321–331. ISBN 978-90-04-08112-3.
- El-Sayed, Ali Ahmed (2020). "The Historical Development of the Regional Capitals That Were the Center of the Mamluk Sultanate Since the Beginning of Their Muslim Era" (PDF). Ciutats mediterrànies: l'espai i el territori. Institut d'Estudis Catalans: 107–119.
- Toussoun, Prince Omar (1931). Egypt's finance from the era of the Pharaohs until now (in Arabic). Alexandria: Al-Salah al-Din al-Kubra Printing House. p. 247.
