= John Elliott Woolford =

British painter

- Born: 1779; London
- Died: 1866 (aged 87–88); Fredericton, New Brunswick
- Occupations: draftsman, painter, architect
- Known for: drawings and painting he made survive and are considered to have historical significance.

John Elliott Woolford (1779–1866) was employed as a draftsman by George Ramsay, 9th Earl of Dalhousie, when he served under him in Egypt, and, later when he served as Colonial Governor in Canada. Some of his work is held by the National Gallery of Canada.

Woolford joined the Army at 19, and by 1800 he served under Ramsay when he commanded an expedition to Egypt. While in Egypt his skill in drafting came to Ramsay's attention, and Ramsay commissioned him as a full-time draftsman, drawing sketches, or making painting, of important landmarks. Woolford may have been an apprentice at the Drawing Room of the Board of Ordnance. He may have studied under Paul Sandby, professor of drawing at the Royal Military Academy.

Woolford left the Army in 1803, and worked for a decade as a landscape painter, in Edinburgh, until Ramsay hired him to be his draftsman, again, when he was appointed Lieutenant Governor of Nova Scotia. When Ramsay was appointed Governor General of British North America Woolford remained in Nova Scotia, where he worked to complete the buildings for Dalhousie College. He joined Ramsay in Quebec, in 1821.

Woolford accompanied Ramsay on a tour of the Canadian wilderness, in 1821.

In 1823 Ramsay arranged a sinecure for Woolford, when he was appointed assistant barrack-master in Saint John, New Brunswick. He soon was appointed barrack-master general, in Frederiction. He served in this position for 36 years.

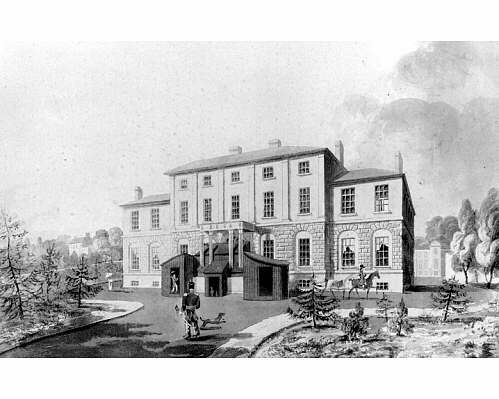
The Government House in Halifax, 1819

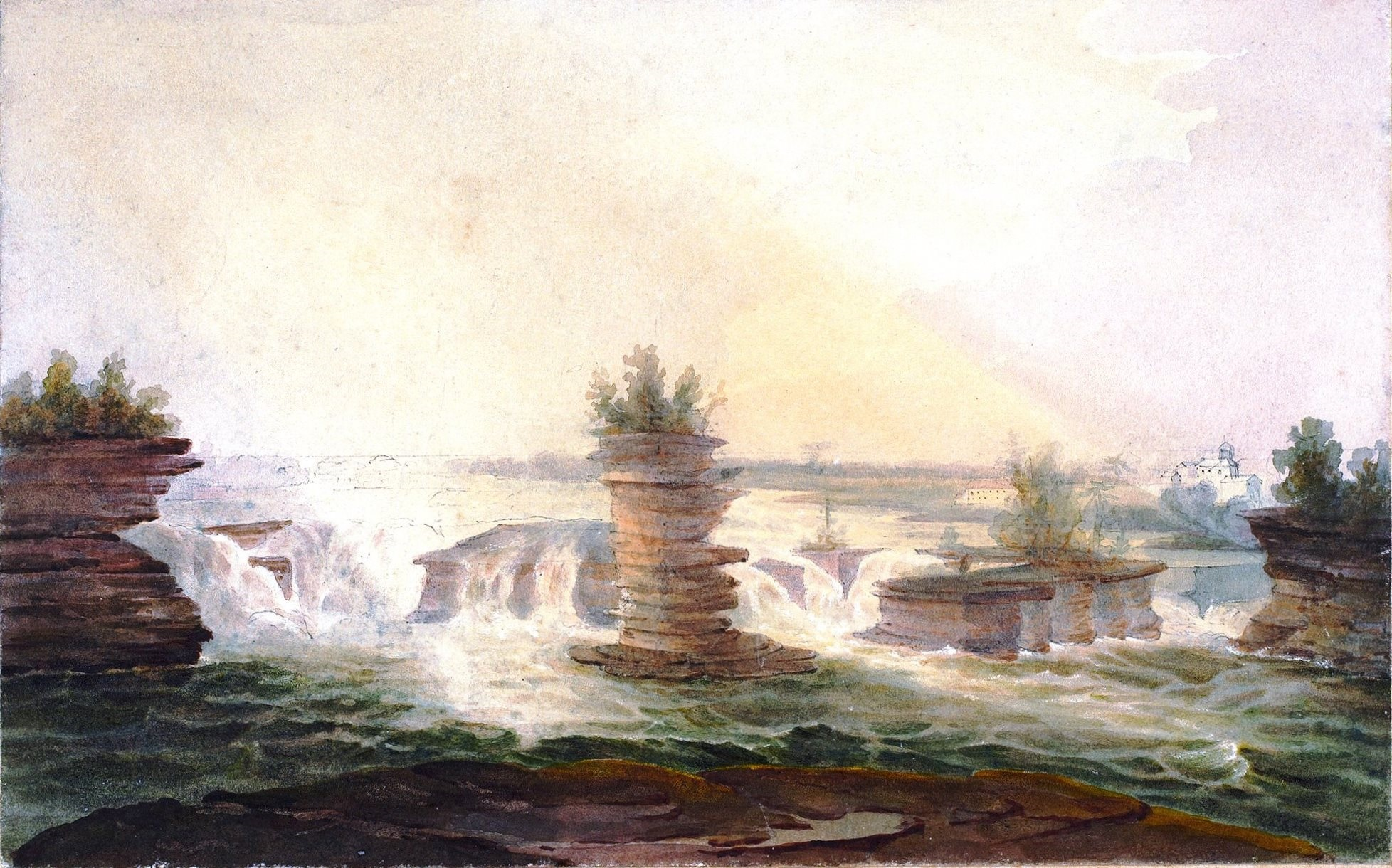
The Chaudiere Falls, Philemon Wright's on the Ottawa, 1821

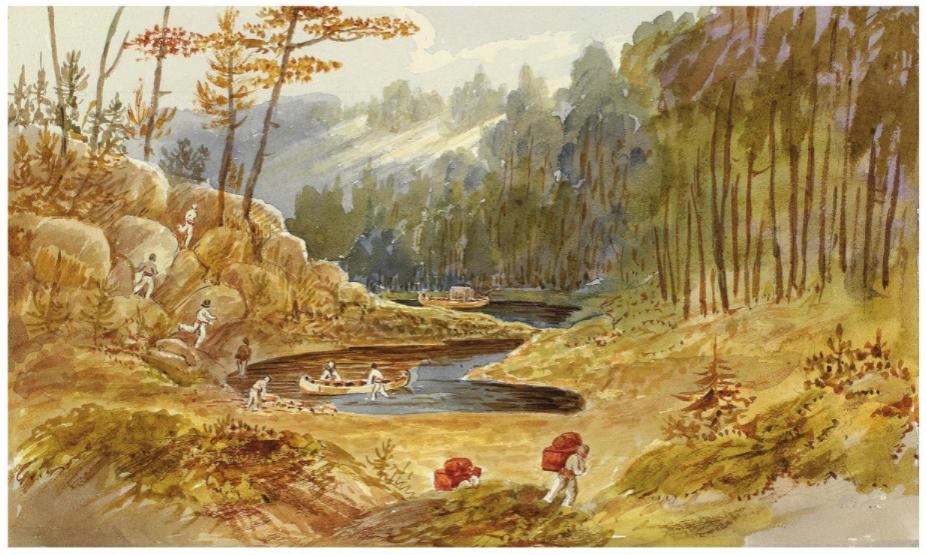
Portage at Lake Nippising, 1821
