= Siege of Fort Julien =

1801 battle of the French invasion of Egypt and Syria

- Part of the French invasion of Egypt and Syria
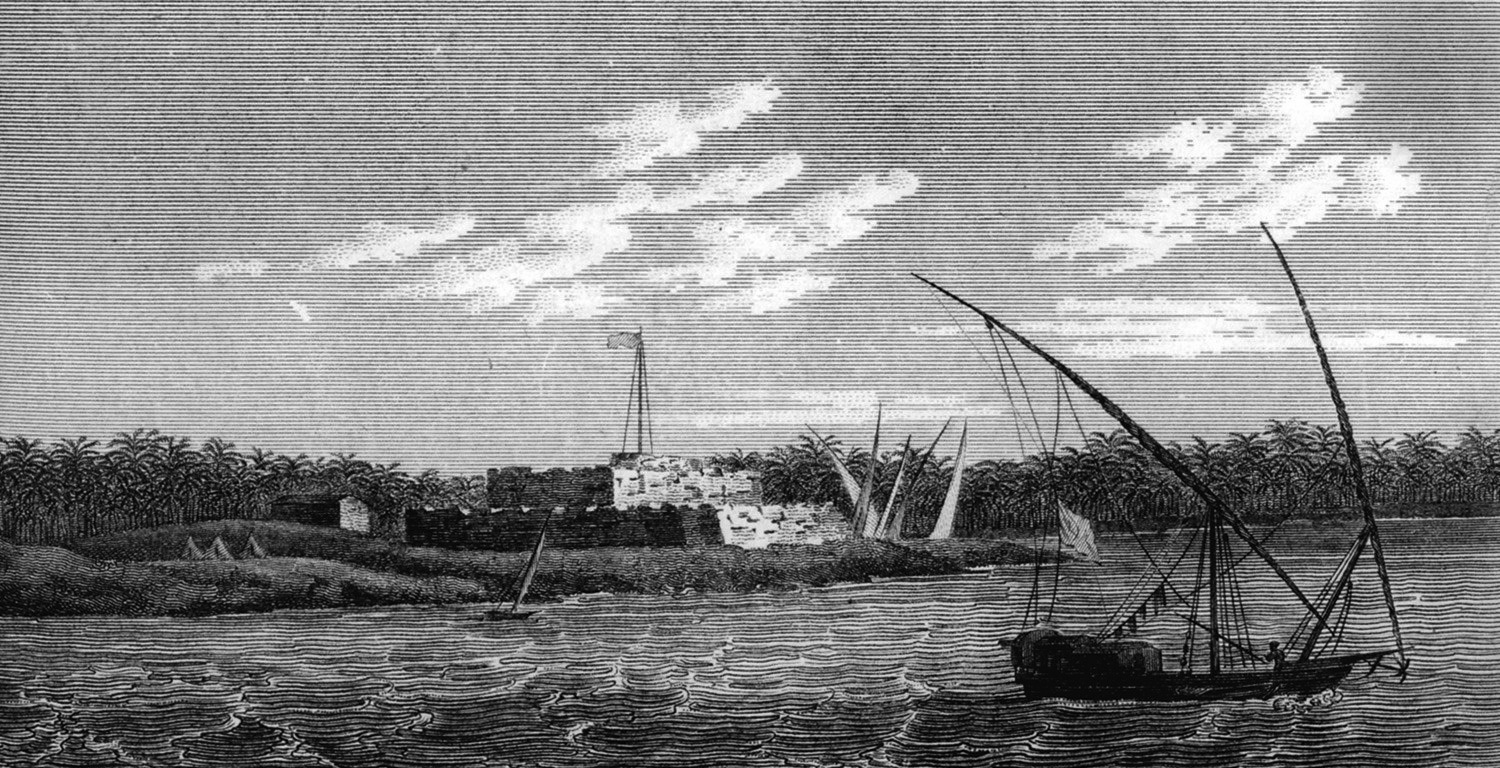
- Illustration of Fort Julien made two years after the siege
Date	8–19 April 1801
Location	Fort Julien, Ottoman Egypt 31.458051°N 30.376188°E
Result	Anglo-Ottoman victory

Belligerents
United Kingdom; Ottoman Empire	France

Commanders and leaders
Lord Dalhousie	Louis Friant (surrendered)

Strength
2,000	306

Casualties and losses
10 killed or wounded	41 killed or wounded 264 captured

The siege of Fort Julien was a military engagement that took place during the French Revolutionary Wars as part of the French invasion of Egypt and Syria from 8 to 19 April 1801. The action was between a British and Ottoman force numbering 2,000 men and a besieged French force of 300 men.

== Background ==
On 19 July 1799, only a few days before the Battle of Abukir, the French took possession of a dilapidated 15th century fortification built by the Mamluk Sultan Qait Bey, and embarked on a hasty rebuilding. The fort, located on the left bank of the Nile near Rosetta (Rashid), was renamed Fort Julien after Thomas Prosper Jullien, one of Napoleon's aides-de-camp. It was during this reconstruction that the Rosetta Stone was found. Fort Julien was an important link in the French defensive line on the route to Cairo and barred access from the sea to the lower reaches of the river. French gunboats operated along the river nearby, blocking access to the mouth of the Nile.

When the British landed at Abukir Bay on 1 March 1801, Baron Charles De Hompesh was sent by General John Hely-Hutchinson to capture Rosetta. Fort Julien was garrisoned by a total of around 300 men, comprising a unit of veterans or invalides supported by artillery and infantry from the 61st demi-brigade.

== Siege ==
The British marched on Rosetta on 8 April, accompanied by 1,000 Ottoman troops, and pushed on to besiege the fort with the 2nd (The Queen's Royal) Regiment of Foot under Colonel Lord Dalhousie.

The siege was complicated by the difficulties of bringing artillery to bear on the fort, a task which took eight days. Seven gunboats had to be dragged for 5 kilometres (3 mi) across sand and mud before they could be relaunched on the Nile. While 24-pound naval carronades were landed on the sea shore and dragged 6 kilometres (4 mi) overland to reach their firing positions. General Robert Lawson of the Royal Artillery took the decision to use naval cannonades rather than heavier standard 24-pounders in the assumption – which proved correct – that the cement used by the French in their hasty improvement work would not yet have hardened. The French gunboats were driven back by their British opponents, enabling other British and Turkish gunboats to enter the river.

On 16 April the artillery preparations were completed and the bombardment commenced, focusing on the south-west angle of the fort. A section of the wall collapsed on 18 April, exposing the French defenders to Turkish sharpshooters. The French then waved white flags; and after negotiations the French agreed to surrender.

== Aftermath ==
At 11:00 on 19 April, the 264 surviving members of the French garrison marched out, thus opening the Nile to the British and Turkish fleet. The French suffered 41 casualties, killed and wounded, while the British side suffered the loss of one lieutenant and two privates. Rossetta was subsequently taken without any opposition.

Hutchinson then invested Cairo and on 27 June the 13,000-strong French garrison under General Augustin Daniel Belliard, out-manned and out-gunned, surrendered. General John Moore then escorted them to the coast via Rosetta.
