= Nicolas-Jacques Conté =

French painter, and inventor of the modern pencil (1755–1805)

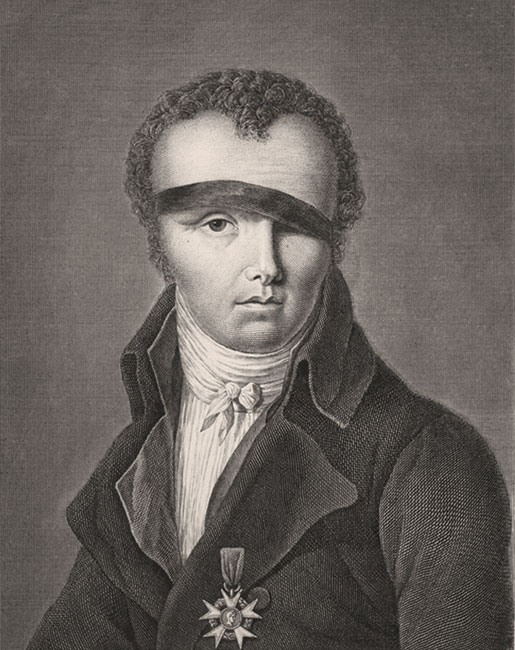
- Born: 4 August 1755; Aunou-sur-Orne
- Died: 6 December 1805 (aged 50); Paris
- Resting place: Montparnasse Cemetery
- Occupations: Painter, Chemist
- Awards: Legion of Honour

Nicolas-Jacques Conté (French pronunciation: [nikɔla ʒak kɔ̃te]; 4 August 1755 – 6 December 1805) was the French inventor of the modern pencil.

He was born at Saint-Céneri-près-Sées (now part of Aunou-sur-Orne) in Normandy to a family of poor farm labourers, and distinguished himself for his mechanical genius, which was of great avail to the French army in Egypt. Napoleon called him "a universal man with taste, understanding and genius capable of creating the arts of France in the middle of the Arabian Desert".

== Early life ==
At the age of fourteen, Conté displayed precocious artistic talent in a series of religious panels, fine in colour and composition, for the principal hospital of Sées, where he was employed to help the gardener. With the advice of Jean-Baptiste Greuze he took up portrait painting, quickly became fashionable, and laid by in a few years a fair competency.

However, from that time he gave free rein to his passion for the mechanical arts and scientific studies. He attended the lectures of Jacques Charles, Louis Nicolas Vauquelin and J. B. Leroy, and exhibited before the French Academy of Sciences an hydraulic machine of his own invention of which the model was the subject of a flattering report, and was placed in Charles's collection.

== Writing and drawing equipment ==
Conté invented the modern pencil lead at the request of Lazare Nicolas Marguerite Carnot. The French Republic was at that time under economic blockade and unable to import graphite from Great Britain, the main source of the material. Carnot asked Conté to create a pencil that did not rely on foreign imports. After several days of research, Conté had the idea of mixing powdered graphite with clay and pressing the material between two half-cylinders of wood. Thus was formed the modern pencil. Conté received a patent for the invention in 1795 and formed la Société Conté to make them. He also invented the conté crayon named after him, a hard pastel stick used by artists.

At the 1798 Exposition des produits de l'industrie française Conté won an honorable distinction, the highest award, for his "crayons of various colours".

== Aeronautics ==
One of his early interests while still at Sées was in the newly developing science of aeronautics. He made at least one hot-air balloon, which he flew in the public square. He contributed to the improvement of the production of hydrogen gas, as well as the treatment of the gas bag of the balloon itself.

Around 1795, he was associated with Gaspard Monge and Claude Louis Berthollet in experiments in connexion with the inflation of military balloons. During one experiment he was leading to produce hydrogen gas, a flask exploded and he lost his left eye.

He conducted the school for the department of the engineer corps at Meudon to perfect methods of producing hydrogen in quantity and in 1796 was appointed by the French Directory to the command of all the aerostatic establishments.

He was at the head of the newly created Conservatoire national des arts et métiers, and occupied himself with experiments in new compositions of permanent colours, and in 1798 constructed a metal-covered barometer for measuring comparative heights, by observing the weight of mercury issuing from the tube.

Sent by Napoleon to Egypt, Conté was called on to exercise his expertise in ballooning and was asked to prepare an ascent for the celebration of the French New Year on 22 September 1798. He was not sufficiently prepared, so the event was postponed to 1 December. On that occasion, his efforts met with a near disaster. The balloon caught fire, and the Egyptians received the impression that what had been demonstrated was a machine of war for setting fire to the enemy encampments. At a second attempt with a larger balloon, it is said that the ascent was witnessed in Esbekia Square by 100,000. It is probable that the use of the balloon in Egypt was limited to impressing the local population and was never found suitable for military purposes. Al-Jabarti, (‘Abd al-Rahman al-Jabarti al-Misri) in his account of the ascent said: "Their claim that this apparatus is like a vessel in which people sit and travel to other countries in order to discover news and other falsifications did not appear to be true."

== Activity in Egypt ==
Conté then considerably extended his field of activity, and for three and a half years was, to quote Berthollet, "the soul of the colony." The battles of Abukir and the Revolt of Cairo had caused the loss of the greater part of the instruments and munitions taken out by the French. Conté seemed to be everywhere at once and triumphed over apparently insurmountable difficulties. He made utensils, tools and machinery of every sort from simple windmills to stamps for minting coin. Thanks to his activity and genius, the expedition was provided with bread, cloth, arms and munitions of war; the engineers with the exact tools of their trade; the surgeons with operating instruments. He made the designs, built the models, organized and supervised the manufacture, and seemed to be able to invent immediately anything required.

== Final years ==
On his return to France in 1802 he was commissioned by the minister of the interior, Jean-Antoine Chaptal, to superintend the publication of the great work of the commission on Egypt, and an engraving machine of his construction materially shortened this task, which, however, he did not live to see finished. He died at Paris on the 6th of December 1805. Napoleon had included him in his first promotions to the Legion of Honour. A bronze statue was erected to his memory in 1852 at Sées, by public subscription.
