= Fort Julien =

Fort in Egypt on the Nile

Fort Julien طابية رشيد
- Rashid, Egypt
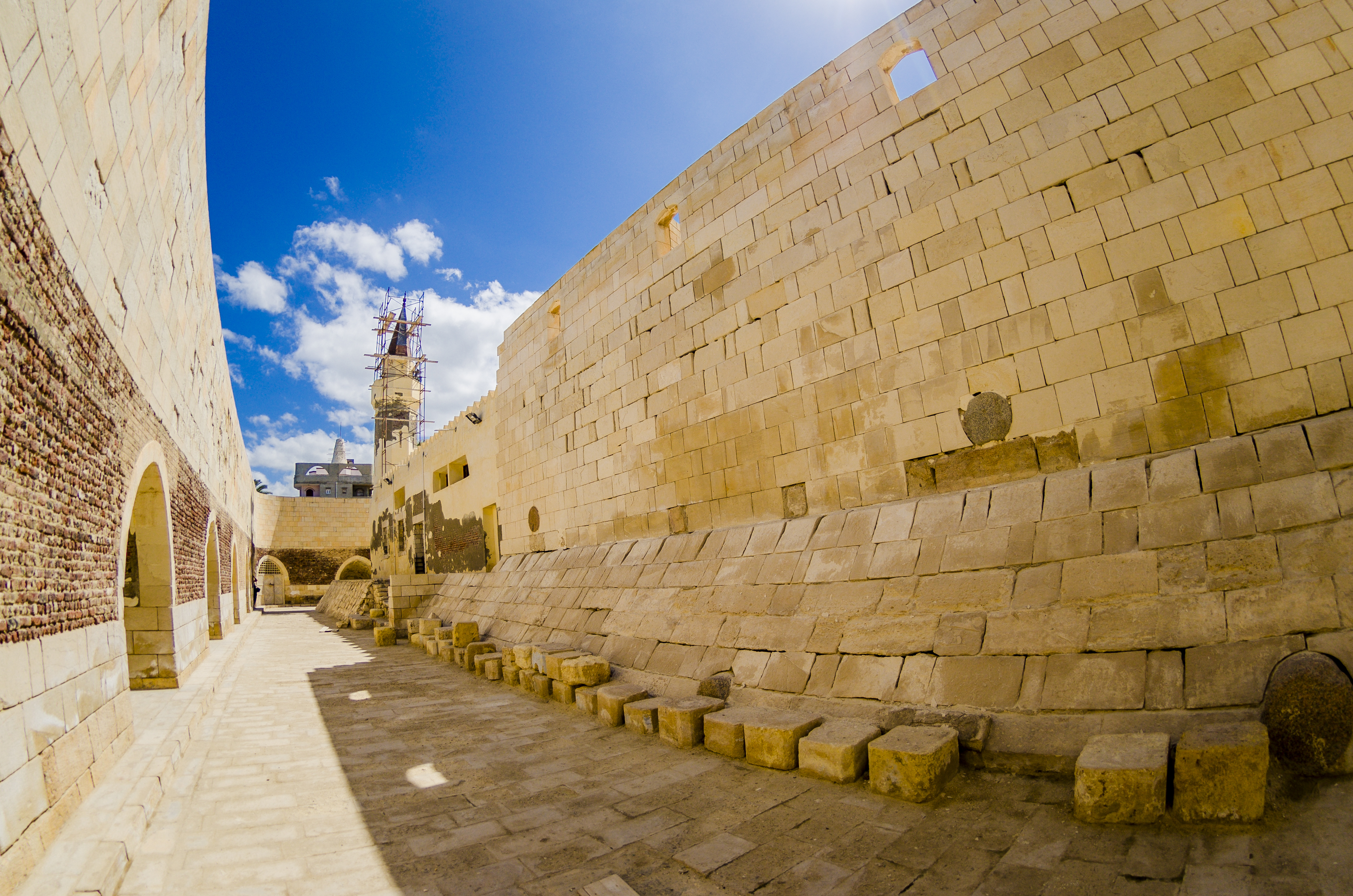
- Rashid Fort, also known as Fort Julien and Qaitbay Fort.

Site information
- Type: Mamluk fort Ottoman fort
- Condition: Intact

Location
- Coordinates: 31°26′23″N 30°23′22″E

Site history
- Built: 1470; 1516 (renovations); 1805–1848 (renovations)
- Built by: Qaitbay (1470); Qansuh al-Ghuri (1516)

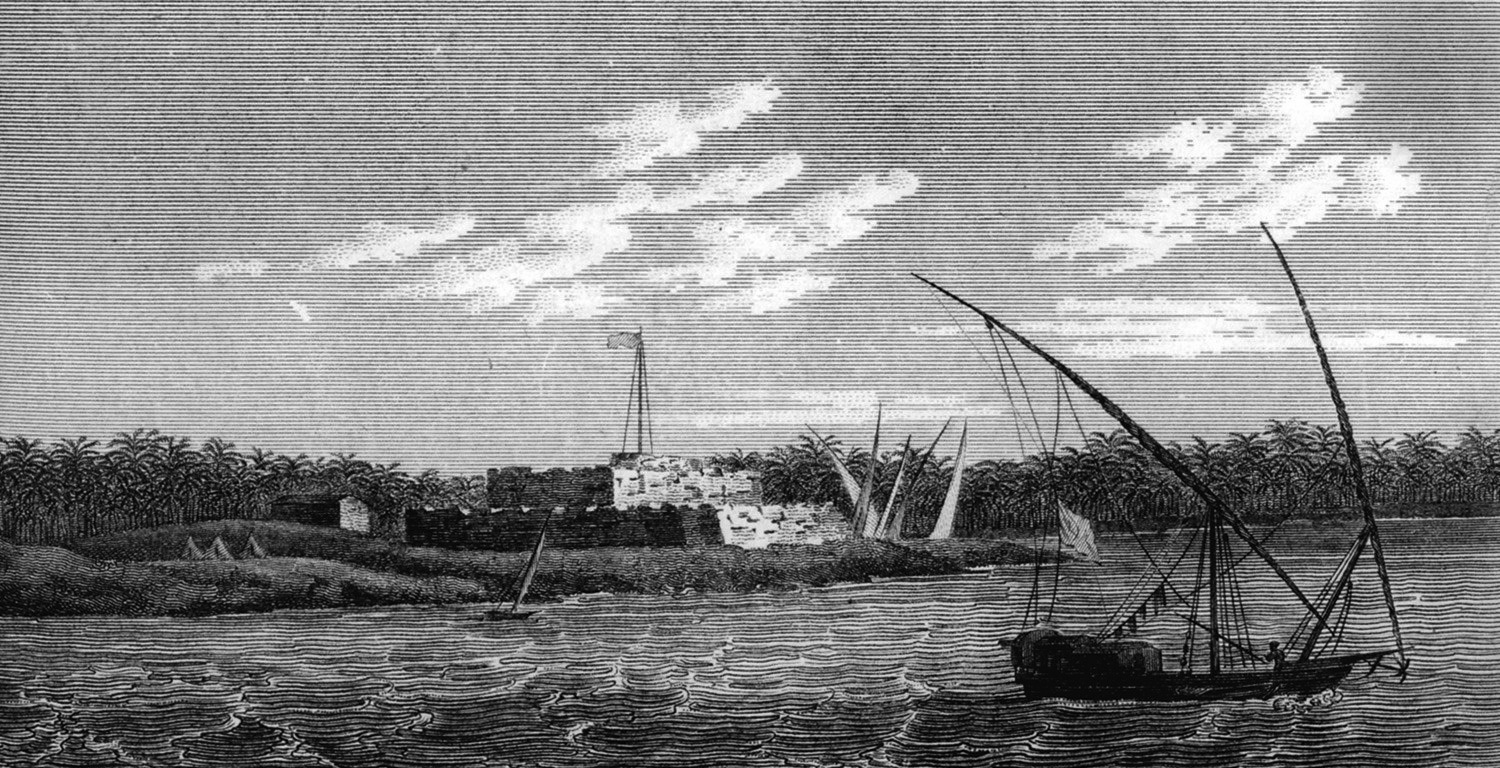
Fort Julien, with an Egyptian Boat, 1803

Fort Julien (or, in some sources, Fort Rashid ) (Arabic: طابية رشيد) is a fort located on the left or west bank of the Nile about 5 kilometres (3.1 mi) north-west of Rashid (Rosetta) on the north coast of Egypt. It was originally built by the Mamluks and occupied by the French during Napoleon Bonaparte's campaign in Egypt and Syria between 1798 and 1801. The fort became famous as the place where the Rosetta Stone was found in 1799.

== Description and history ==
The fort is a low, squat rectangular structure with a central blockhouse that overlooks the final few kilometres of the Nile before it joins the Mediterranean Sea. It was built around 1470 by the Mamluk Sultan Qait Bey, who also built the eponymous Citadel of Qaitbay in Alexandria. In 1516, Sultan Qansuh al-Ghuri reinforced it with a defensive wall. The fort subsequently fell into disrepair. The fort was built in part from stone looted from nearby ancient Egyptian sites; when Vivant Denon visited it in 1799, he noted that it was "constructed of parts of old buildings; and that several of the stones of the embrasures were of the fine free-stone of Upper Egypt, and still covered with hieroglyphics."

=== Discovery of the Rosetta Stone ===
The French took possession of the dilapidated fort on 19 July 1799, only a few days before the Battle of Abukir, and embarked on a hasty rebuilding. It was subsequently reconstructed in a more thoroughgoing fashion and was renamed Fort Julien after Thomas Prosper Jullien. One of Napoleon's aides-de-camp, Lieutenant Pierre-François Bouchard, uncovered the famous Rosetta Stone at the fort while repairing its defences. Qait Bey's engineers had apparently brought it to the site from elsewhere, possibly a temple at nearby Sais, to use as fill. Two years later, the fort was captured by a combined Anglo-Ottoman force after a short siege and bombardment.

=== Current condition ===
The fort was extensively restored by the Egyptian government in the 1980s and reopened in 1985 by President Hosni Mubarak. It is now surrounded on three sides by the village of Izbat Burj Rashid and is open to the public. It is possible to reach it by taxi from Rashid.
