= Fuwwah =

Fuwwah فوه
- City
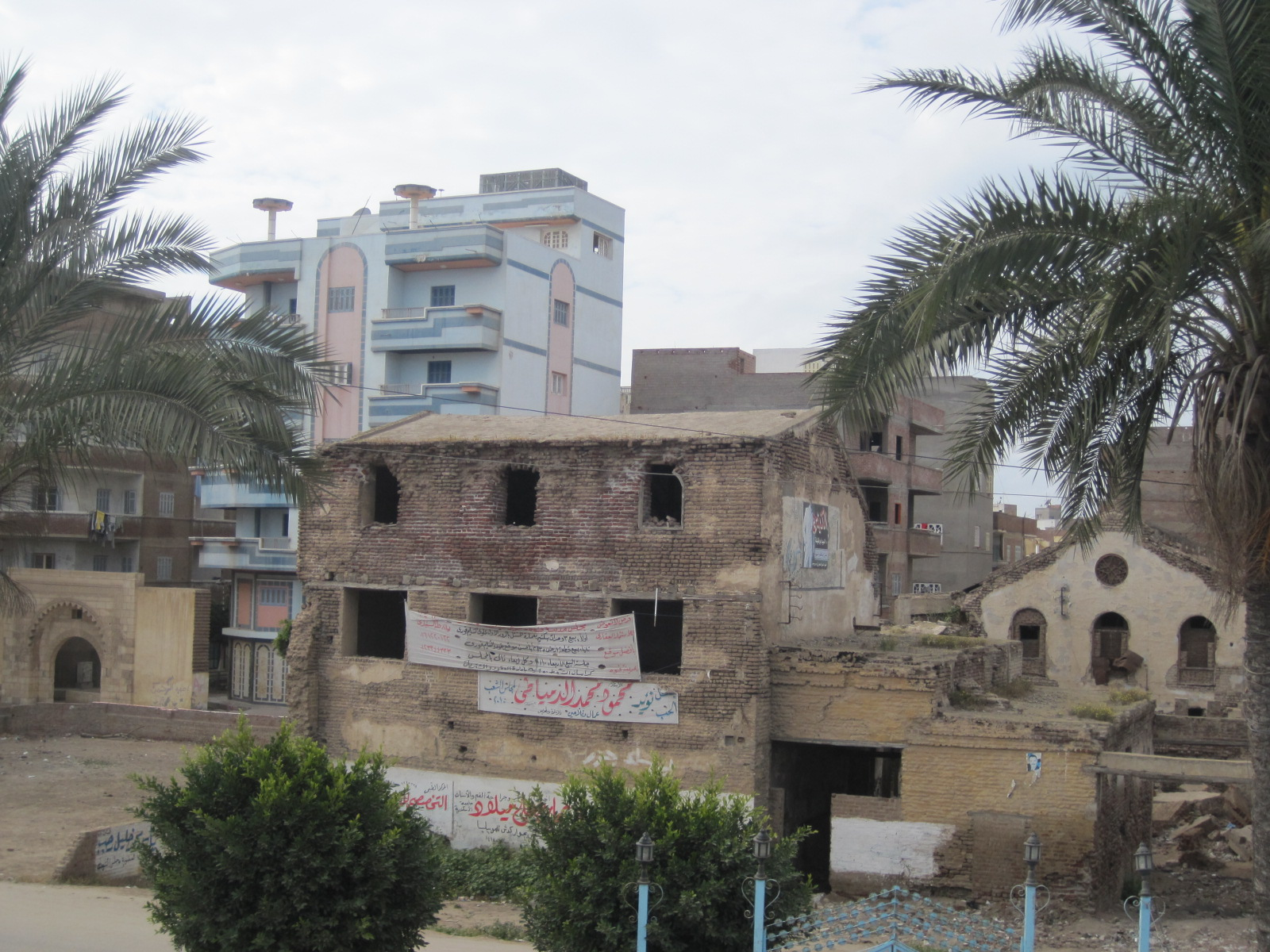
- Remnants of the Fez Factory in Fuwwa

- Location in Egypt
- Coordinates: 31.203258°N 30.550354°E
- Country: Egypt
- Governorate: Kafr El Sheikh
- Time zone: UTC+2 (EET)
  - Summer (DST): UTC+3 (EEST)

Fuwwah (Arabic: فوه; Coptic: ⲫⲟⲩⲁ or ⲃⲟⲩⲁ) is a city in the Kafr El Sheikh Governorate, Egypt.

== Name ==
The name of the town is attested in Coptic: ⲫⲟⲩⲁ or ⲃⲟⲩⲁ and Ancient Greek: Παυα, although it's also claimed that the name is derived from the Arabic word for saffron, fuwa.

== History ==
Medieval Fuwwah grew to become one of the most important cities in al-Dimashqi's time, when he compared its size to that of Cairo. Fuwwah's prosperity owed largely to the decline of Rosetta at that time. Fuwwah was the capital of a province variously called Fuwwah or Al-Muzahamiyatayn.

Fuwwah's Christian bishopric remained active through the late thirteenth century, indicating the presence of a large Christian population at the time. Its location on the Rosetta branch of the Nile meant that residents could easily travel by boat, the main mode of transport in the Nile Delta at the time - overland travel was potentially dangerous, as evidenced by the inability of Yusab, the bishop of Fuwwah, to travel to the Synod of 1250 due to Bedouin raids.

One of the most important monuments in Fuwwah is the Fez factory established in 1824 by an order from Muhammed Ali Pasha.

The 1885 Census of Egypt recorded Fuwwah as a nahiyah under the district of Desouk in Gharbia Governorate; at that time, the population of the town was 9,902 (4,805 men and 5,097 women).
