= Aunou-sur-Orne =

- Commune
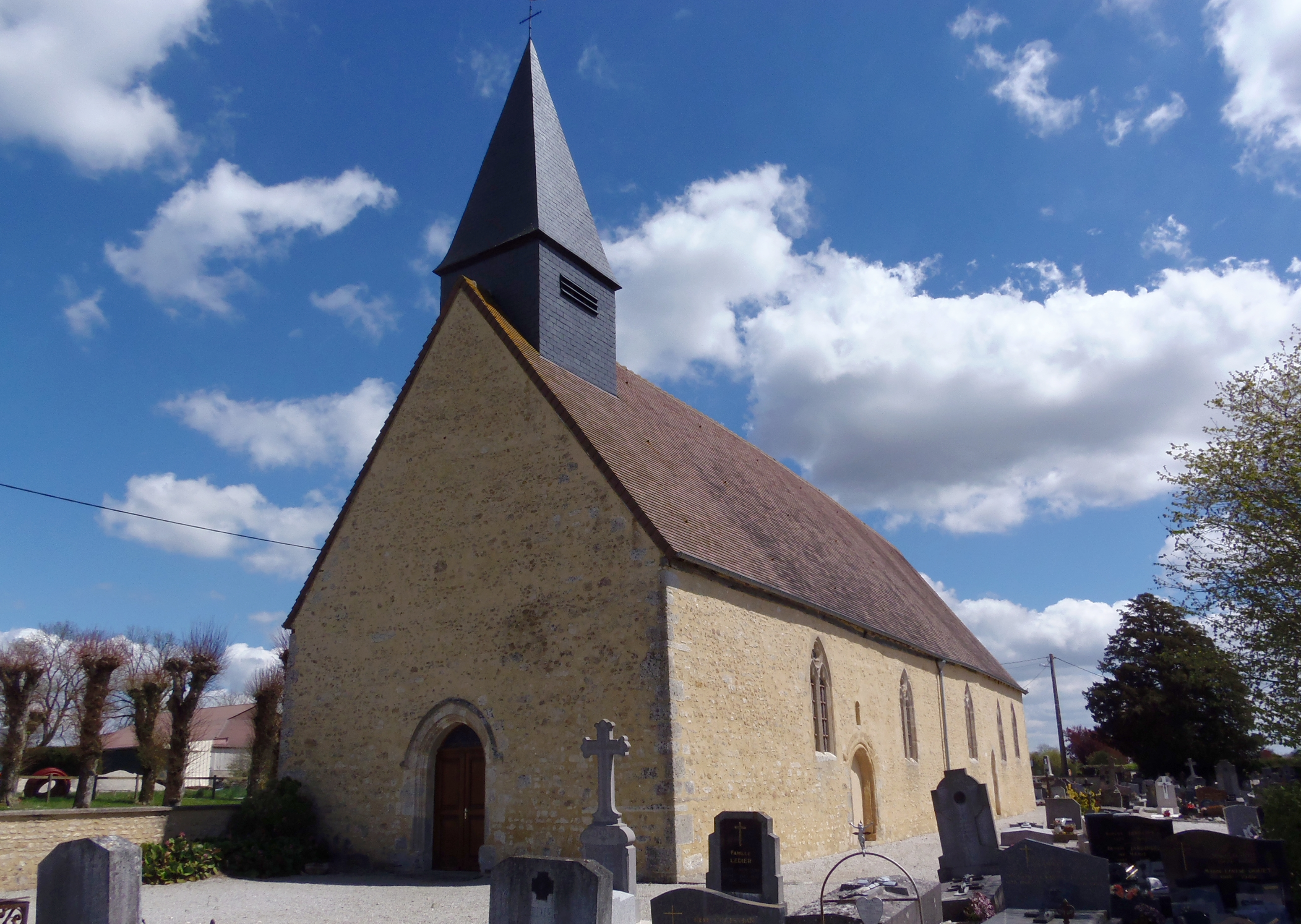
- The church in Aunou-sur-Orne
- Location of Aunou-sur-Orne
- Location within France Location within Normandy
- Coordinates: 48°36′44″N 0°13′50″E
- Country: France
- Region: Normandy
- Department: Orne
- Arrondissement: Alençon
- Canton: Sées
- Intercommunality: CC Sources Orne

Government
  - Mayor (2020–2026): Laurence Lubrun
- Area^{1}: 18.04 km^{2} (6.97 sq mi)
- Elevation: 200 m (660 ft)
- Highest elevation: 233 m (764 ft)
- Lowest elevation: 171 m (561 ft)
- Population (2023): 283
  - Density: 15.7/km^{2} (40.6/sq mi)
- Time zone: UTC+01:00 (CET)
  - Summer (DST): UTC+02:00 (CEST)
- INSEE/Postal code: 61015 /61500
- ^{1} French Land Register data, which excludes lakes, ponds, glaciers > 1 km^{2} (0.386 sq mi or 247 acres) and river estuaries.

Aunou-sur-Orne (French pronunciation: [onu syʁ ɔʁn], literally Aunou on Orne) is a commune in the Orne department in northwestern France.

== Geography ==
The commune is made up of the following collection of villages and hamlets, Fresneaux, Aunou, Monthioux, Aunou-sur-Orne and Foligny.

Aunou-sur-Orne along with another 65 communes is part of a 20,593 hectare, Natura 2000 conservation area, called the Haute vallée de l'Orne et affluents.

The commune contains the source of the river Orne. In addition another two rivers La Senelle and La Vézone, also flow within the commune.

== History ==
In 1811 Aunou-sur-Orne absorbed the neighbouring commune of Saint-Cenery-près-Séez (sometimes spelled Saint-Cénery-près-Sées or Saint-Céneri-près-Sées).

== Population ==
Historical population
Year	Pop.	±% p.a.
1968	273	—
1975	227	−2.60%
1982	207	−1.31%
1990	257	+2.74%
1999	255	−0.09%
2007	255	+0.00%
2012	264	+0.70%
2017	266	+0.15%
2023	283	+1.04%
Source: INSEE

== Personalities ==
Nicolas-Jacques Conté (4 August 1755 – 6 December 1805) was a French painter, balloonist, army officer, and inventor of the modern pencil. He was born at Saint-Céneri-près-Sées.

== See also ==
- Communes of the Orne department
