= Battle of Abukir =

Battle of Abukir may refer to:

- Battle of Abukir (1799), a battle of the French Revolutionary Wars
- Battle of Abukir (1801), a battle of the French Revolutionary Wars

== See also ==
- Abukir, Egypt
- Battle of the Nile or Battle of Abukir Bay (1798)
- The Battle of Aboukir (Lejeune), an 1804 painting by Louis-François Lejeune
- The Battle of Aboukir, an 1806 painting by Antoine-Jean Gros
