= Rosetta =

City in Beheira governorate, Egypt

Rosetta رشيد Rashid
- City
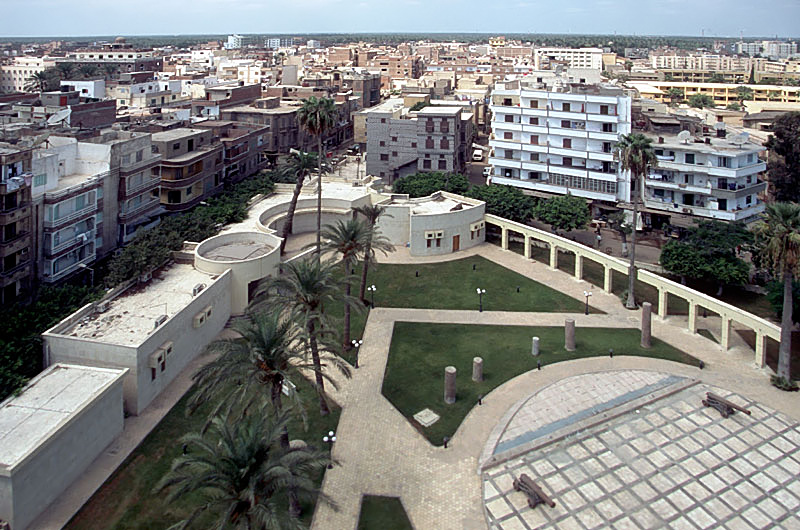
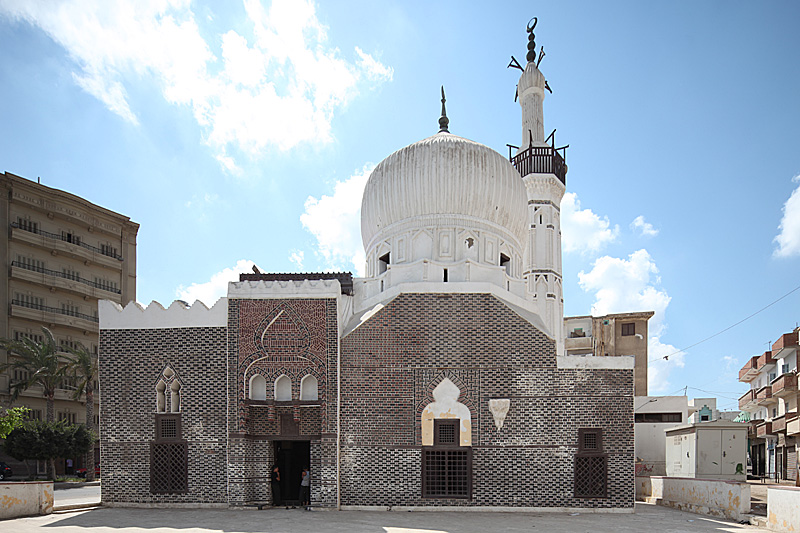
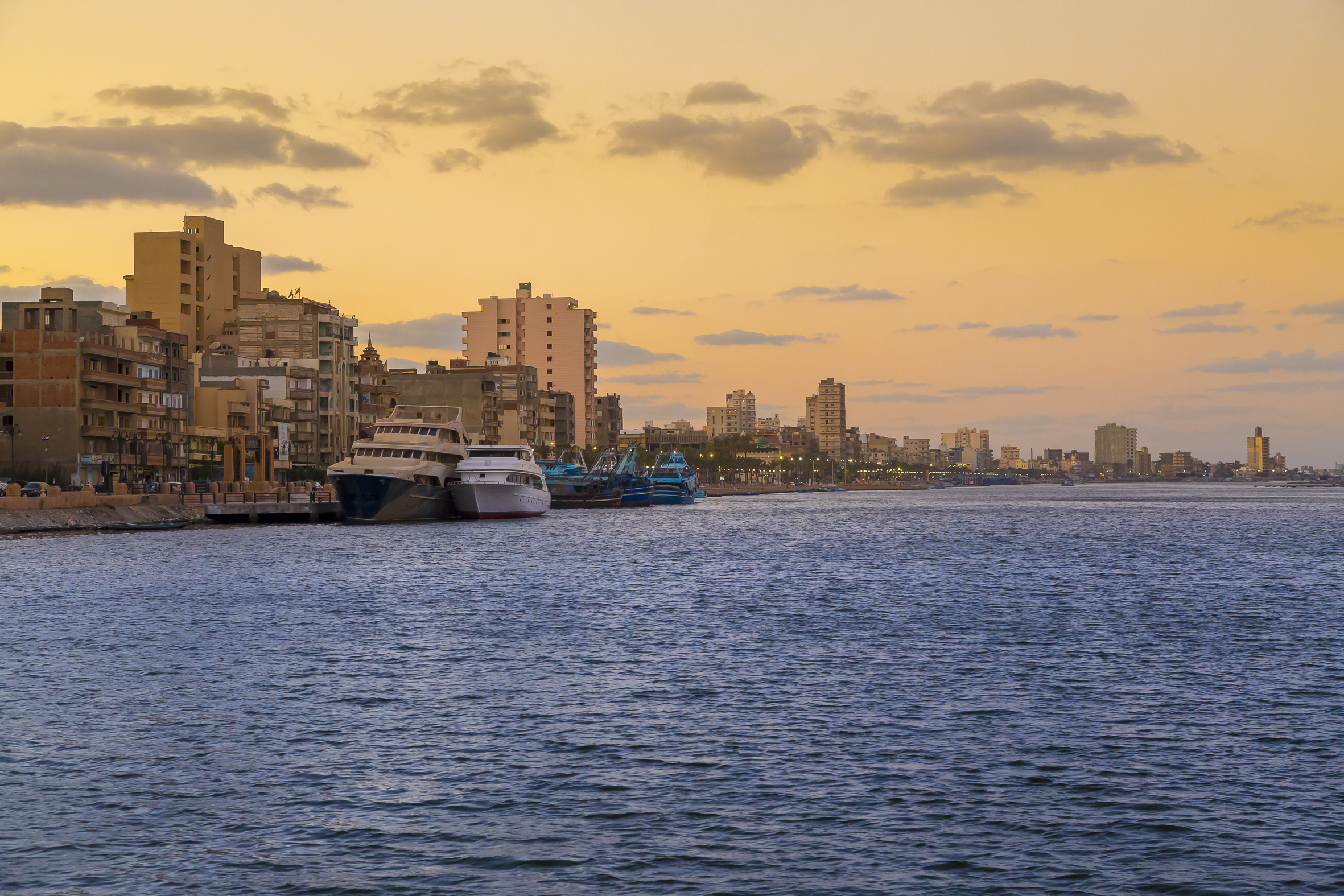
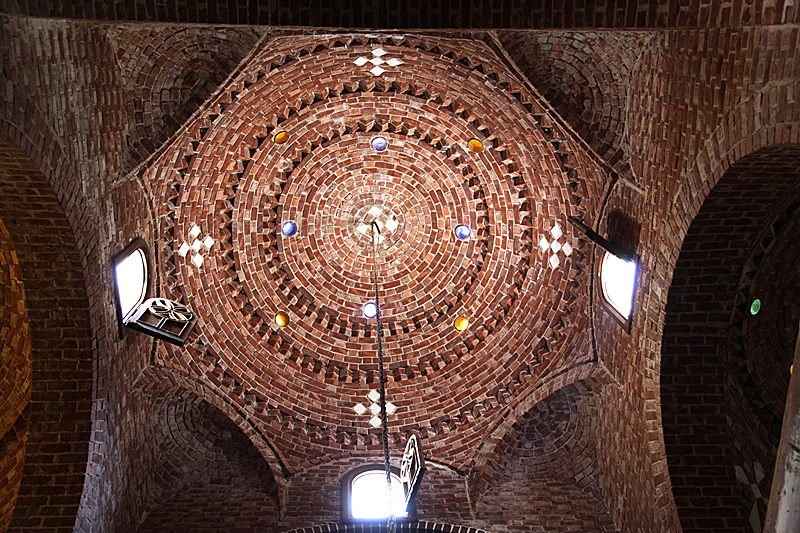
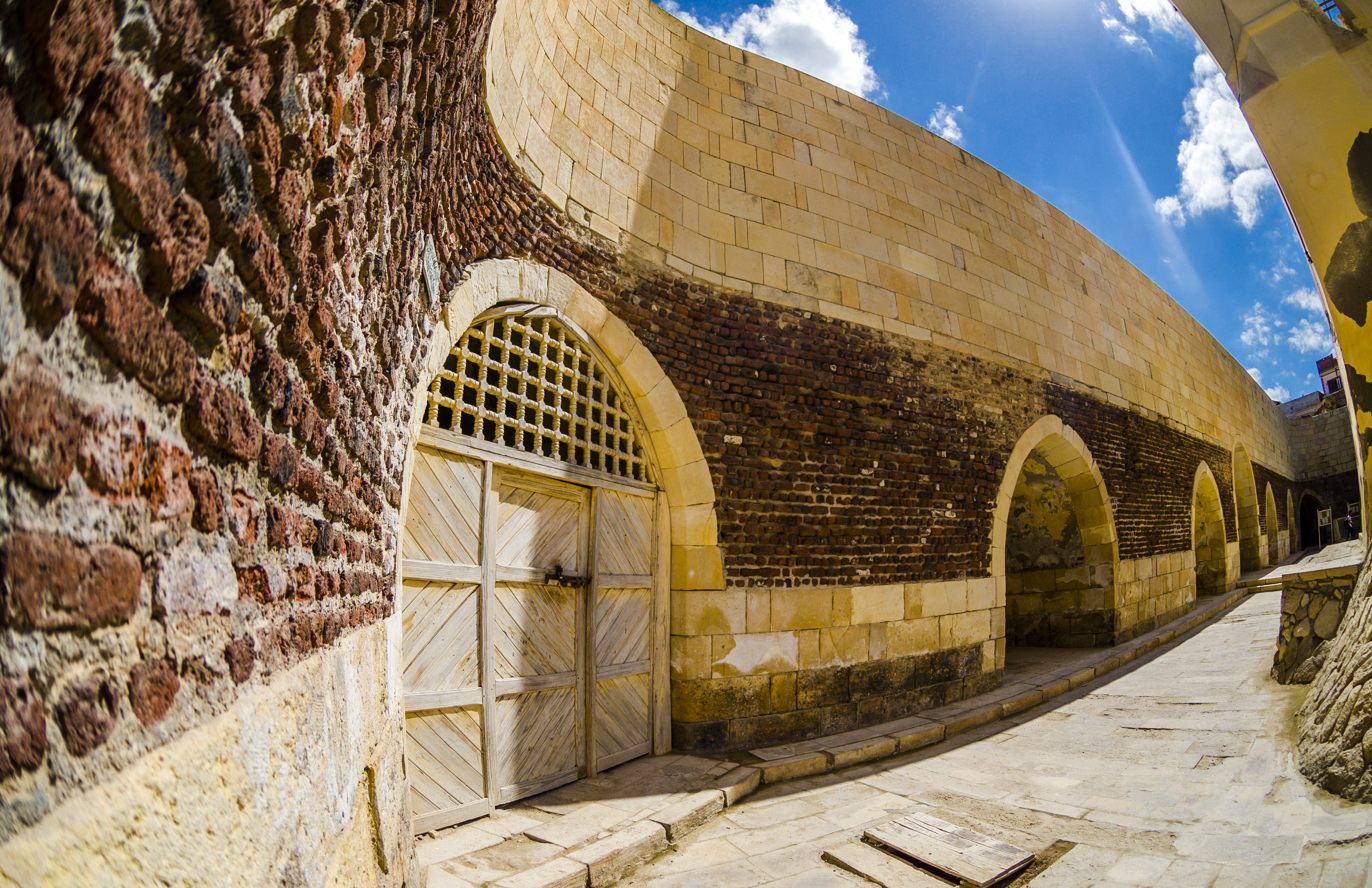
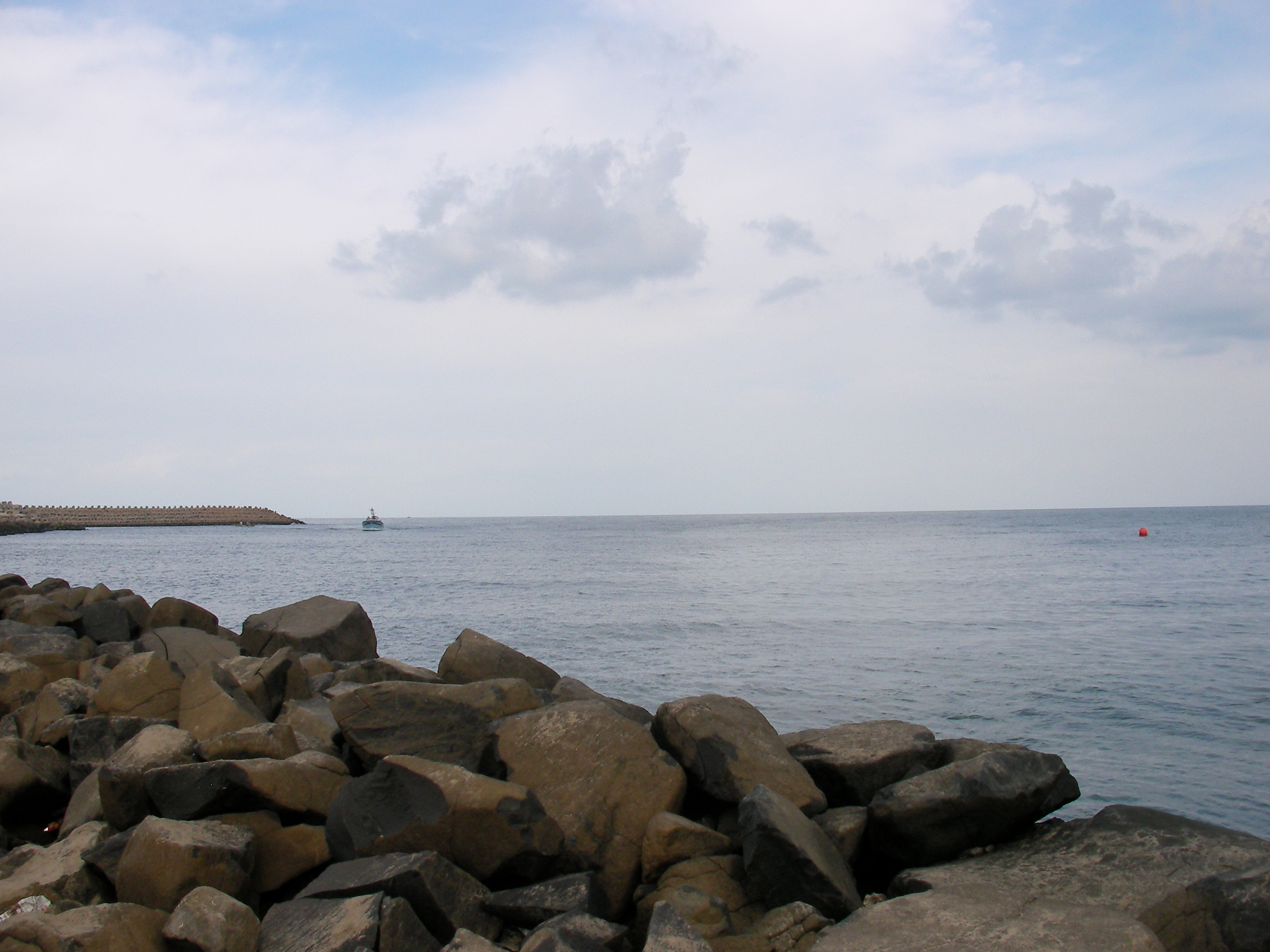
- View of North Rosetta Abbasi Mosque Rosetta Corniche Dome of the St. Mark Church Old town The Nile The Mediterranean

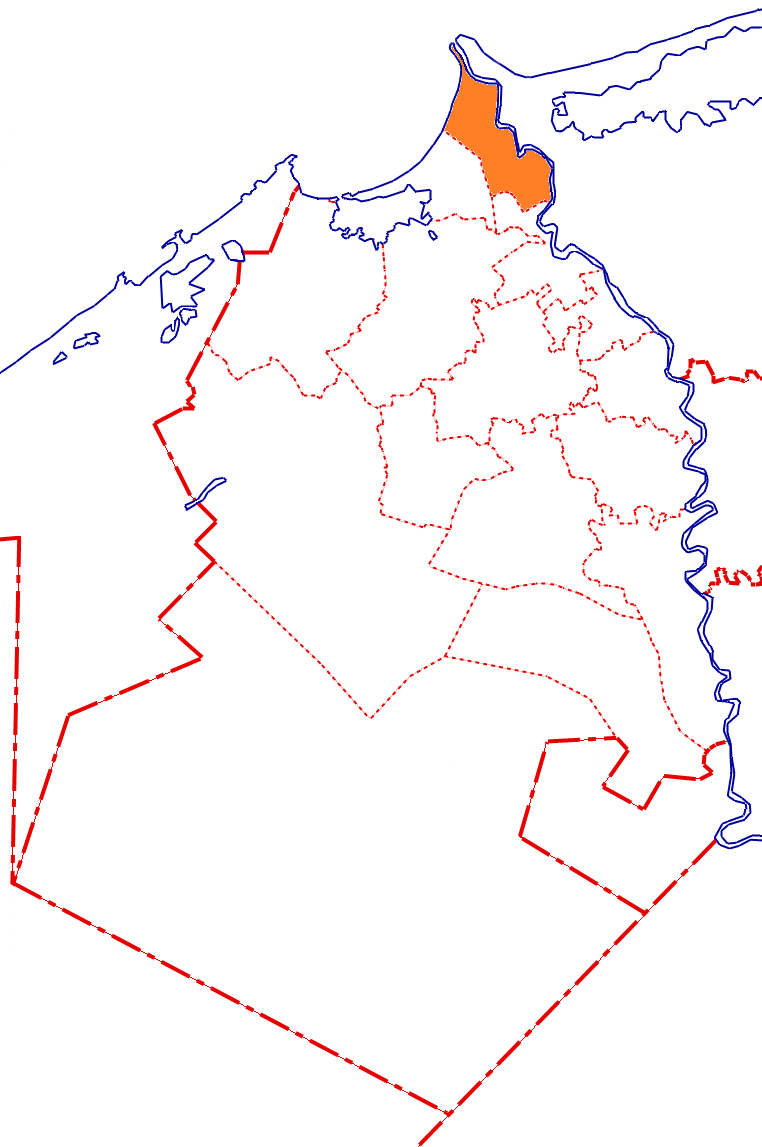
- Location in Beheira Governorate

- Location in Egypt Rosetta (Egypt)
- Coordinates: 31°24′16″N 30°24′59″E
- Country: Egypt
- Governorate: Beheira
- Established: 850

Area
  - Total: 196.6 km^{2} (75.9 sq mi)
- Elevation: 2 m (6.6 ft)

Population (2021)
  - Total: 301,795
  - Density: 1,535/km^{2} (3,976/sq mi)
- Time zone: UTC+2 (EET)
  - Summer (DST): UTC+3 (EEST)

Rosetta (/roʊˈzɛtə/ roh-ZET-ə) (Note: French: Rosette, IPA: [ʁozɛt].) or Rashid (Arabic: رشيد, romanized: Rašīd, IPA: [ɾɑˈʃiːd]; Coptic: ϯⲣⲁϣⲓⲧ, romanized: ti-Rashit) (Note: Ancient Greek: Βολβιτίνη, romanized: Bolbitínē.) is a port city of the Nile Delta, 65 km (40 mi) east of Alexandria, in Egypt's Beheira governorate. The Rosetta Stone was discovered in nearby Fort Julien in 1799.

Founded around the 9th century on the site of the ancient town of Bolbitine, Rosetta boomed with the decline of Alexandria following the Ottoman conquest of Egypt in 1517, only to wane in importance after Alexandria's revival. During the 19th century, it was a popular British tourist destination, known for its Ottoman mansions, citrus groves and relative cleanliness.

== Etymology ==
The name of the town most likely comes from an Arabic name Rašīd (meaning 'guide') and was transcribed and corrupted in numerous ways – the name Rexi was used by the Crusaders in Middle Ages and Rosetta or Rosette ('little rose' in Italian and French, respectively) was used by the French at the time of Napoleon Bonaparte's campaign in Egypt. The latter lent its name to the Rosetta Stone (French: Pierre de Rosette), which was found by French soldiers at the nearby Fort Julien in 1799.

Some scholars believe that there is no evidence that the city's name comes from Egyptian, and the Coptic form ϯⲣⲁϣⲓⲧ is just a late transcription of the Arabic name. Some argue that it could be derived from Ancient Egyptian: rꜣ-šdı͗, lit. 'dug up mouth (of the Nile)' and that the name is ancient.

== History ==
Because of the proverbial phrase in Ancient Greek: Βολβιτίνη ἅρμα, lit. 'Bolbitine chariot', researchers believe that Bolbitine was celebrated for its manufactory of chariots in antiquity. The city was near the mouth of a branch of the Nile that was called the Bolbitine mouth (τὸ Βολβίτινον στόμα). Herodotus wrote that the Bolbitine mouth was not a natural but an excavated channel.

Iban Haqal mentioned it and said that it is a city on the Nile, close to the salt sea from a crater known as Ashtum (Ancient Greek: Στόμα, lit. 'mouth, estuary'). Also mentioned in the Al-Mushtaq excursion, it was described as a civilized city with a market, merchants and workers, and it has farms, yields, wheat and barley, and it has many good words, and it has many palm trees and wet fruits, and it has whales and fish species from the salty sea and many indigo fish.

Despite the similarity of Rashid and Damietta in their geographical and administrative position throughout the ages and as an important coastal city, Rashid did not play a clear, influential role compared to Damietta's role in the beginnings of Arab Islamic rule, especially for Rashid's proximity to the location of Alexandria, which is the first coastal city in Egypt and primarily affected Rashid and its position. Likewise, the agricultural area in Rashid is very limited, and the spread of sand formations to the west of the city and its urbanization has a greater impact on the city and its agriculture; As a result, Rashid was deserted several times by its residents and they took refuge in Fuwwah, in the south.

What is now known today as Rosetta was an Umayyad stronghold in 749, when it was sacked during the Bashmuric Revolt. In the 850s, the Abbasid caliph Al-Mutawakkil ordered a fort to be built on the site of the Ptolemaic city of Bolbitine, and the medieval city grew around this fort.

Following the establishment of the Fatimid state in 969, and the establishment of the city of Cairo as the new capital of the country, foreign trade was active that was no longer limited to Alexandria only. Rather, Rashid and Damietta participated in it, especially in the beginnings of the Fatimid state, which made urbanism restart.

In the era of the Ayyubid state, neighboring Alexandria witnessed extensive commercial activity as a result of the concessions granted by the Ayyubids to Italian merchants, and before the Bay of Alexandria was re-cleared in 1013 in the Fatimid era by order of Al-Hakim bi-Amr Allah, which contributed to linking Alexandria to the city of Fuwwah, south of Rashid and overlooking the Nile. And from it to Cairo and the rest of the cities of Egypt, and this led to the flourishing of the commercial activity of Fuwwah, which affected the movement of trade Rashid, so that in the era of the Mamluks Fuwwah became the base of the trade networks in the region.

During the Seventh Crusade, Louis IX of France briefly occupied the town in 1249. Following the destruction of Damietta during the crusade, Al-Zahir Baybars built it again in 1250. However, due to the huge costs of protecting it with strong walls and an impenetrable castle, he built a fortress in 1262 to monitor any possible upcoming invasion. During the reign of Al-Nasir Muhammad, the Gulf of Alexandria was re-excavated, so the commercial movement flourished more in Alexandria and was uttered so much that it became the mouth of Egypt's most important commercial city after Cairo. This had a more negative impact on Rashid, to the point that Abu al-Fidaa noted in the thirteenth century that the city was smaller than his mouth.

Rashid contributed to the launching of the naval campaigns during Sultan Barbsay reign to invade the island of Cyprus and bring it under Egyptian control in 1426. Rashid also suffered from the attacks of the Christian knights who lived on the island of Rhodes during the reign of the sultan Sayf ad-Din Jaqmaq. Sultan Jaqamq sent a large garrison to protect Rashid's beach. and ordered its reinforcement in the following years. Then the throne came to Qaitbay and renewed the Rashid Towers in 1479 and renewed the castle, which was named after him so far, and built a wall to protect the city from raids. Generally, Rashid had a defensive role with a little commercial role.

Under the Mamluks, the city became an important commercial center, and remained so throughout Ottoman rule, until the eventual resurgence of the importance of Alexandria following the construction of the Mahmoudiyah canal in 1820. Rosetta witnessed the defeat of the British Fraser campaign, on 19 September 1807.

== Geography ==
The city is located 65 km (40 mi) east of Alexandria, in Egypt's Beheira governorate.

=== Climate ===
Köppen-Geiger climate classification system classifies its climate as hot desert (BWh), but blowing winds from the Mediterranean Sea greatly moderate the temperatures, typical to the Egypt's north coast, making its summers moderately hot and humid, with winters that are mild and moderately wet when sleet and hail are also common.

Rafah, Alexandria, Abu Qir, Rosetta, Baltim, Kafr el-Dawwar and Mersa Matruh are the wettest places in Egypt.

Climate data for Rosetta
Month	Jan	Feb	Mar	Apr	May	Jun	Jul	Aug	Sep	Oct	Nov	Dec	Year
Mean daily maximum °C (°F)	17.8 (64.0)	17.8 (64.0)	20.0 (68.0)	22.2 (72.0)	25.0 (77.0)	27.2 (81.0)	27.8 (82.0)	28.9 (84.0)	28.9 (84.0)	27.2 (81.0)	23.9 (75.0)	20.0 (68.0)	23.9 (75.0)
Daily mean °C (°F)	15.0 (59.0)	15.0 (59.0)	17.2 (63.0)	18.9 (66.0)	22.2 (72.0)	23.9 (75.0)	26.1 (79.0)	27.2 (81.0)	26.1 (79.0)	25.0 (77.0)	20.6 (69.1)	17.2 (63.0)	21.2 (70.2)
Mean daily minimum °C (°F)	12.3 (54.1)	11.9 (53.4)	13.6 (56.5)	15.7 (60.3)	19.2 (66.6)	22.2 (72.0)	24.2 (75.6)	24.9 (76.8)	23.8 (74.8)	21.6 (70.9)	18.3 (64.9)	14.1 (57.4)	18.5 (65.3)
Average rainfall mm (inches)	60 (2.4)	30 (1.2)	14 (0.6)	5 (0.2)	2 (0.1)	0 (0)	0 (0)	0 (0)	1 (0.0)	10 (0.4)	28 (1.1)	53 (2.1)	203 (8.1)
Average relative humidity (%)	70	66	64	65	69	72	73	71	67	65	66	68	68
Source: Arab Meteorology Book

== Population ==
The population of Rosetta has increased since the 1980s, as follows:

- 1983: 36,711 (approximate)
- 1986: 51,789
- 1996: 58,432

== Gallery ==
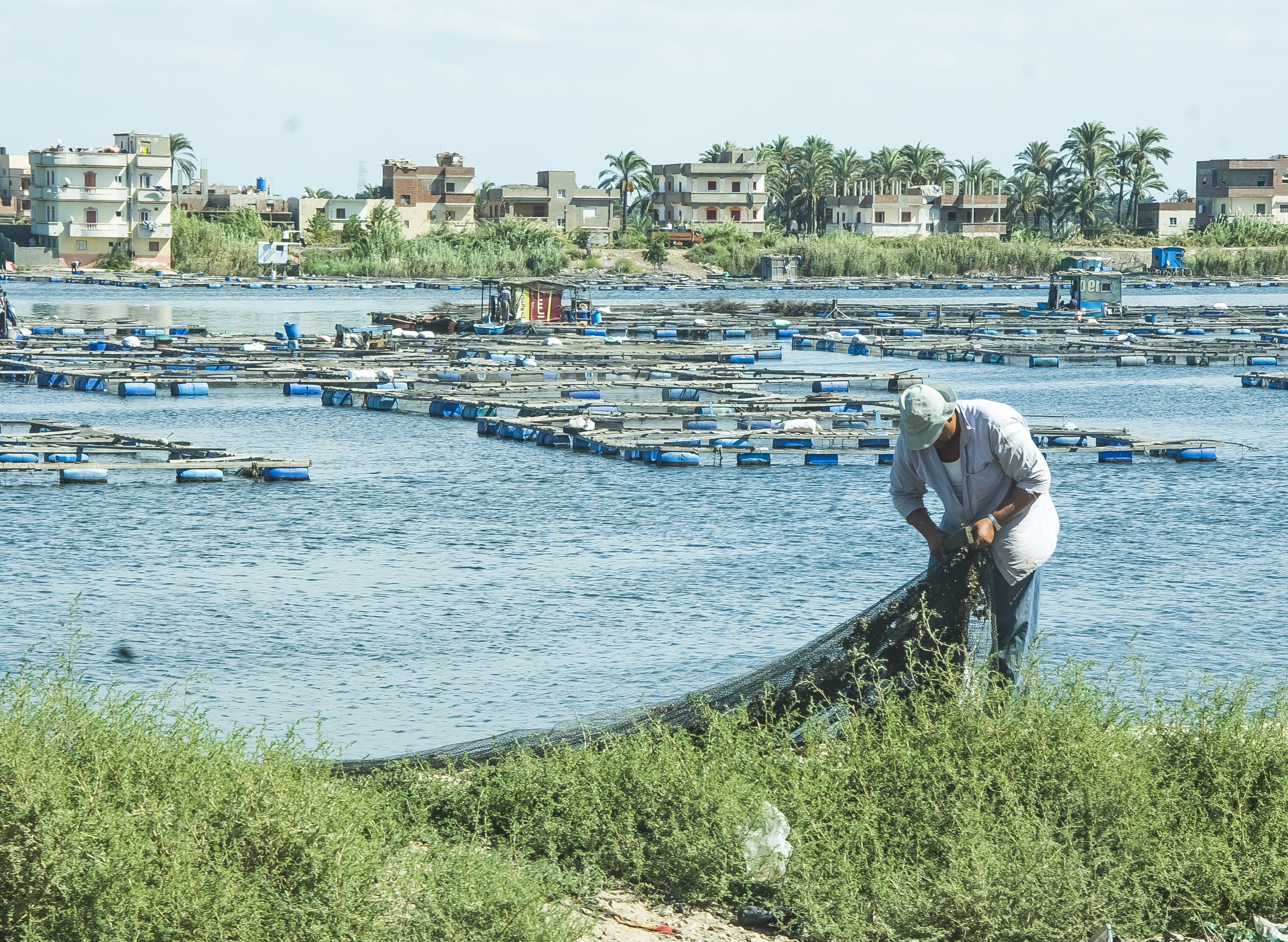
Fishing

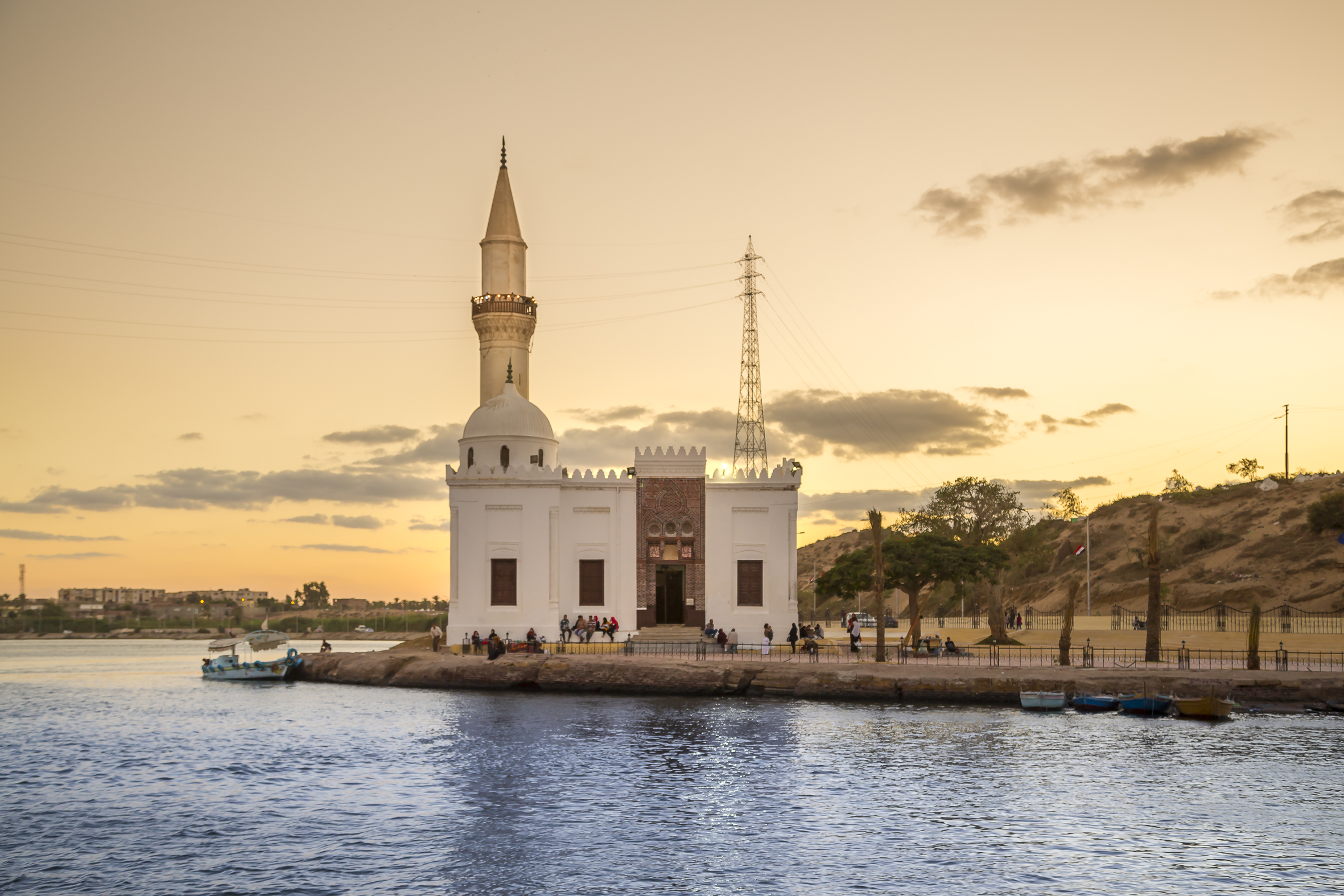
Abou Mandour Mosque

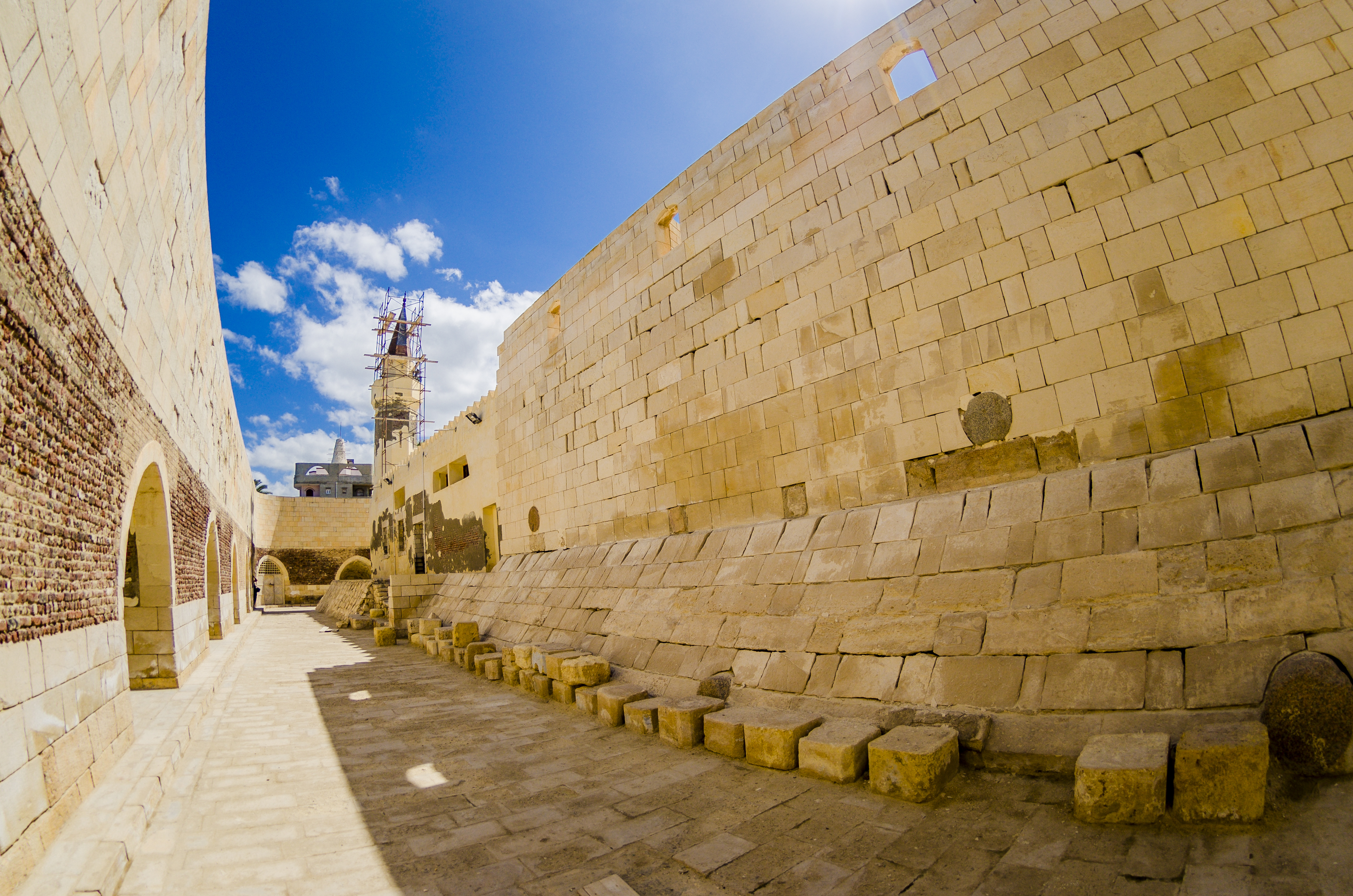
Rashid old walls

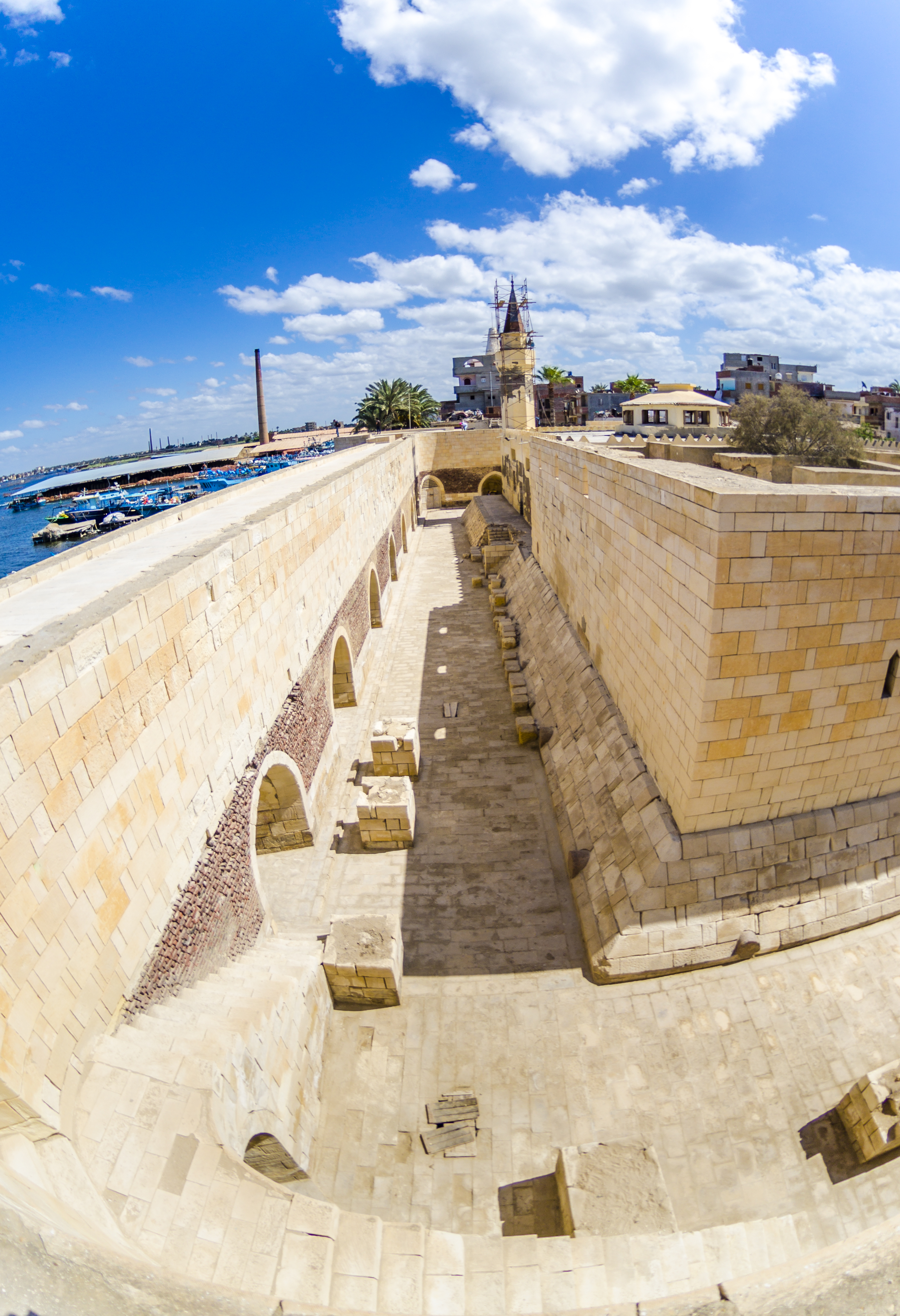
Rashid Fort

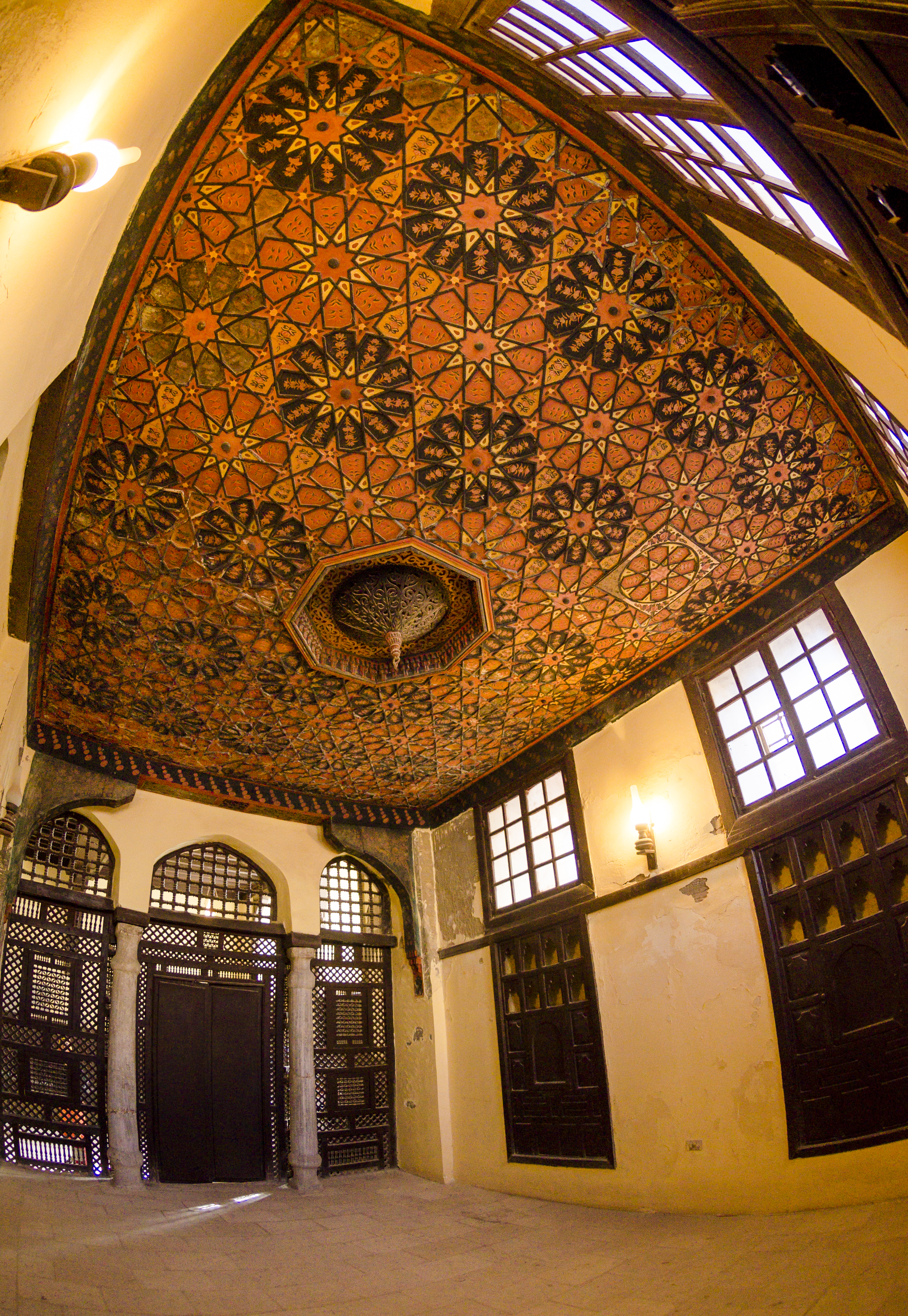
Old houses indoors

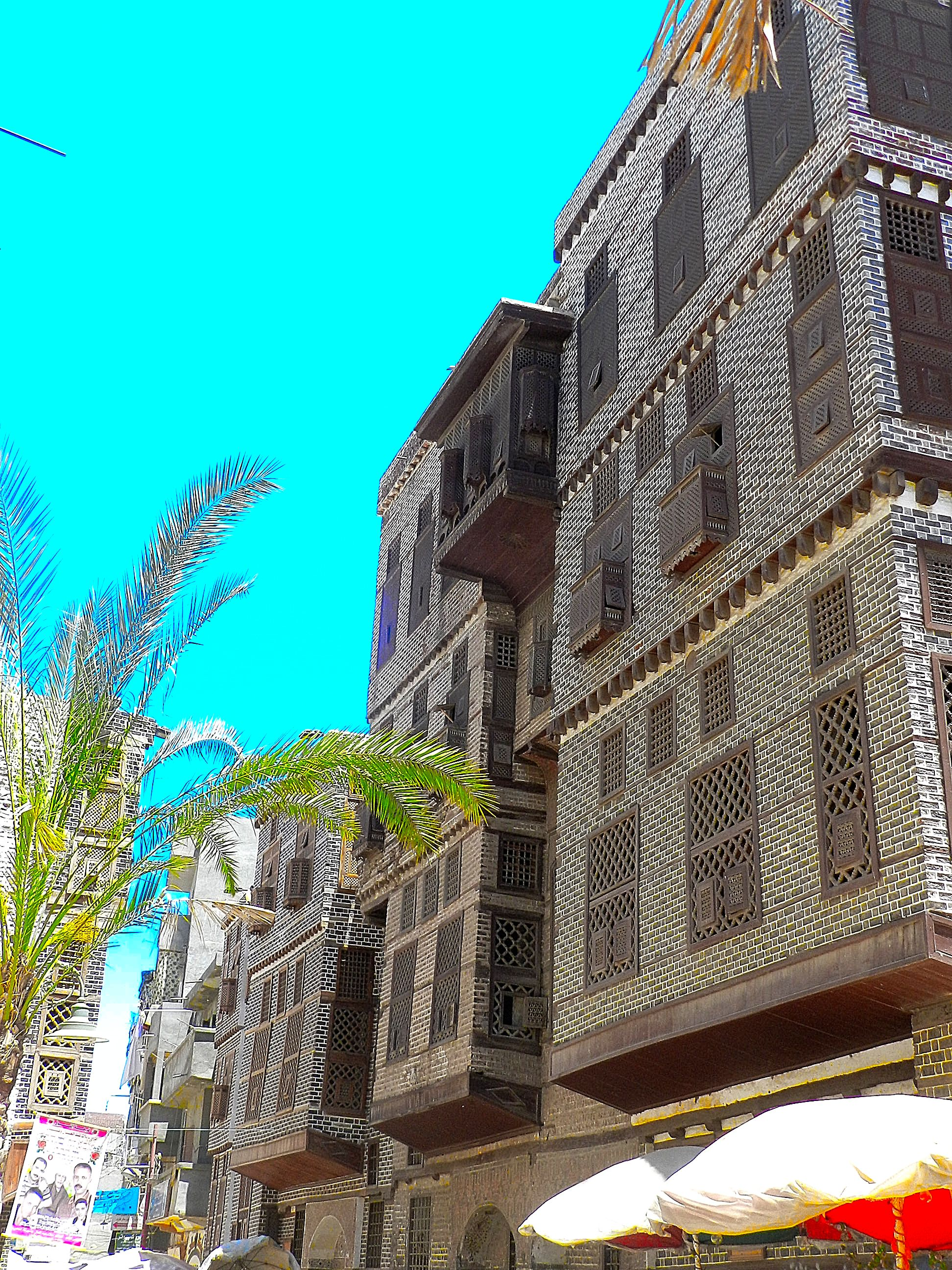
Beit Ramadan

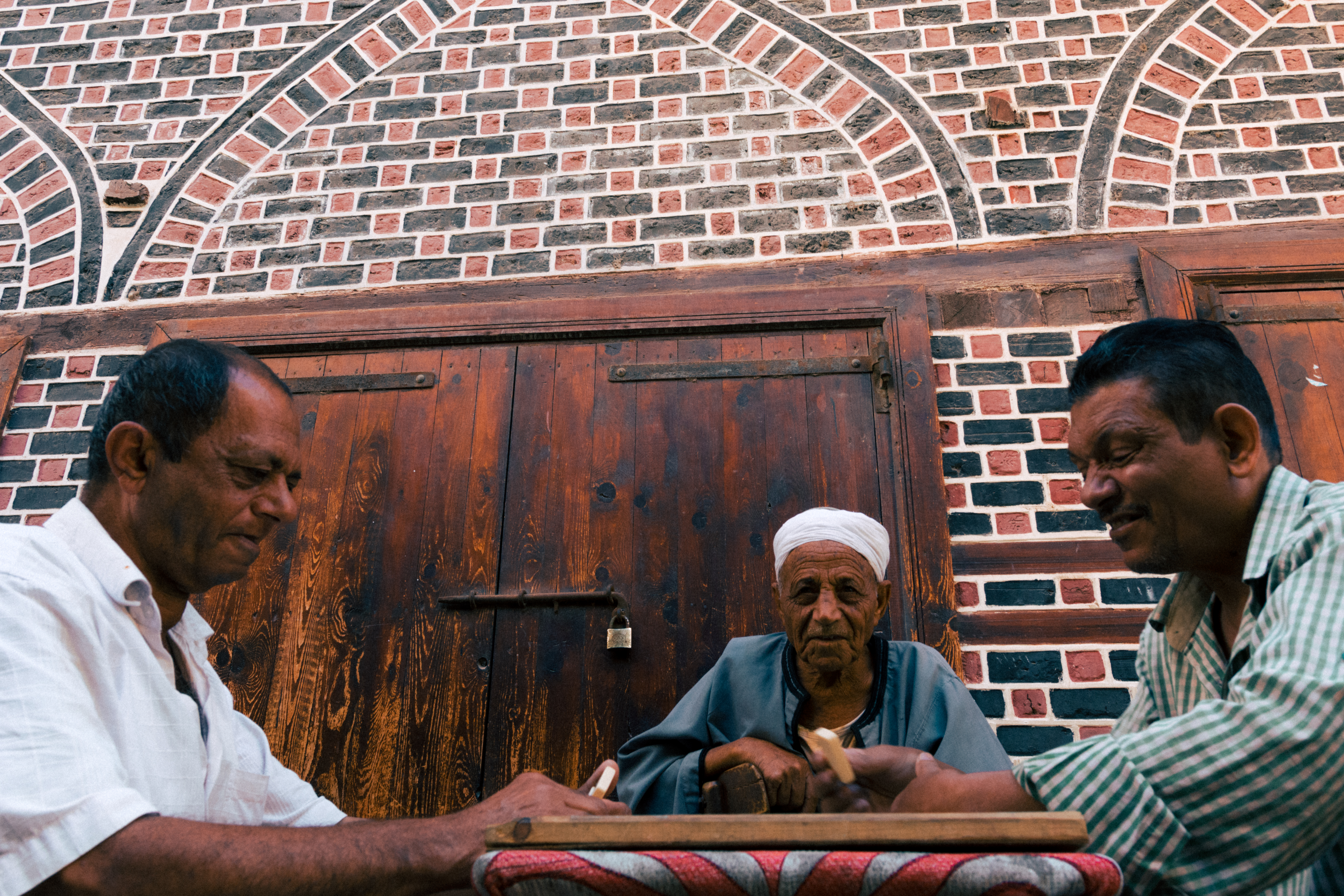
Playing dominoes

== Bibliography ==
- "Rosetta", Encyclopaedia Britannica, Chicago, 1983.
