= Forge (disambiguation) =

A forge is the hearth where the blacksmith keeps the fire for heating metals to be formed by plastic deformation, usually with hammer on an anvil.

Forge may also refer to:

== Industry ==
- Forging, the process of deforming a metal workpiece by working with localized compressive forces
- Finery forge, a works where pig iron was fined and forged (drawn out) into bars of wrought iron
- Bloomery, a forge where iron ore was smelted to produce wrought iron

== Media and arts ==
- Forge (character), a mutant superhero in the Marvel Comics universe who is associated with the X-Men
- Forge, a book of poetry by Jan Zwicky, 2011
- Forge, a 2010, a historical fiction book by Laurie Halse Anderson
- Forge, a website on productivity published by Medium
- The Forge (Goya), a painting by Francisco Goya
- "The Forge" (Star Trek: Enterprise), an episode of Star Trek: Enterprise
- The Forge, a novel by Radclyffe Hall published in 1924
- The Forge, a British TV production company founded by George Faber
- Forged (film), a 2010 drama film
- The Forge, a 2024 Christian biblical drama film
- Forge (film), a 2025 American comedy-drama film

== Computer gaming ==
- Forge (level editor), a map editor for the Halo series of video games
- A planned but canceled sequel to LucasArts's adventure game Loom
- Forge (video game), a game by Dark Vale Studios
- Forge Mod Loader (FML), a popular modification loader in Minecraft modding

== Roleplaying gaming ==
- The Forge (roleplaying game website), dedicated to indie roleplaying games

== Computer software ==
- Forge (software), a collaborative software development management system
- Sound Forge, a digital audio editing and creation suite

== Places ==
- Forge, Cornwall, England
- Forge, Powys, Wales
- Clifton Forge, Virginia, USA
- Pigeon Forge, Tennessee, USA
- Valley Forge, Pennsylvania, USA

== People with the name ==
- Andrew Forge (1923-2002), English painter
- Tobias Forge (born 1981), Swedish singer, musician, and songwriter

== Other uses ==
- FORGE Program, a United Nations-sanctioned NGO that links Western students to African refugees
- Forge FC, a Canadian soccer club
- Forger Peak, a mountain in Canada
- The Forge (restaurant), a restaurant in Miami Beach, Florida
- The Forge Shopping Centre, Glasgow, Scotland
- Ponds Forge, sports centre in Sheffield, England

== See also ==
- Forge World
- The Forge of God
- Forgery (disambiguation)
- La Forge (disambiguation)
- Old Forge (disambiguation)
- Forgy (disambiguation)
