= Rampon =

Rampon may refer to:

- Rampon, Count of Barcelona (died 825)
- Antoine-Guillaume Rampon (1759–1842), general officer during the French Revolutionary Wars
- Joachim Rampon (1805–1883), French soldier, aristocrat and politician
- Rampon, a type of traditional fishing in Goa, India, as detailed in Ramponkar movement
