= Forgy (disambiguation) =

Forgy may refer to:

- Forgy, Ohio, unincorporated community in Ohio, USA
- William Forgy McNagny, American politician
- Alice Forgy Kerr, American politician
- Larry Forgy, American politician
- Charles Forgy, American computer scientist

== See also ==
- Forge (disambiguation)
- Forty
