= Thomas Fortye =

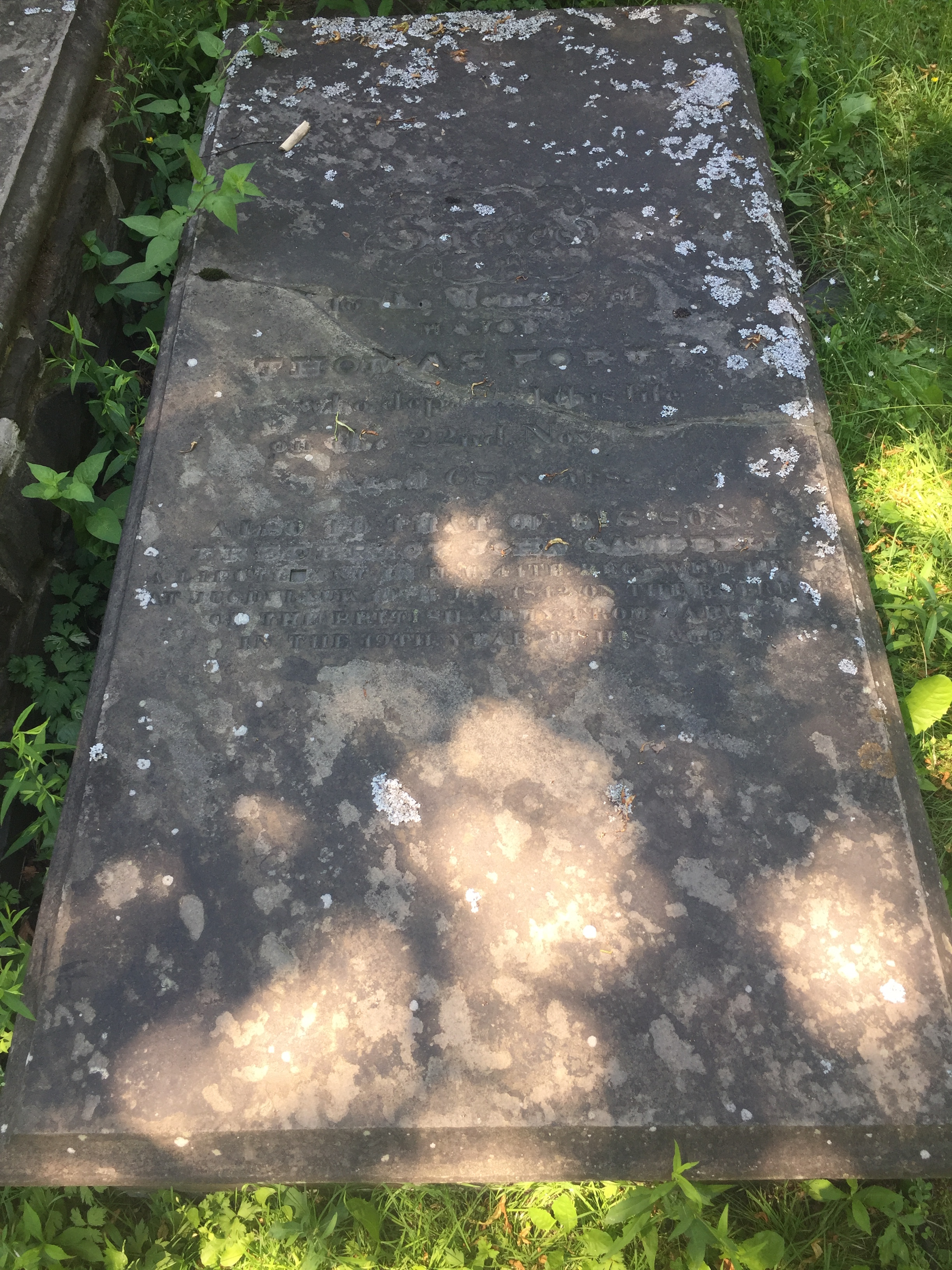
Thomas Fortye, Old Burying Ground, Halifax, Nova Scotia

Major Thomas Fortye (b. c. 1783, Toronto, Ontario – 22 November, Halifax, Nova Scotia) fought in the French Revolutionary War and was injured in the Battle of Mandora. He led various Veteran Battalions, was the Lieutenant Governor of Shetland and eventually settled in Halifax, Nova Scotia. He married the niece of Sir Colin Campbell. He was a Barrack Master. He retired to Halifax in April 1834.

== Career ==
Major Fortye joined the 8th (The King's) Regiment of Foot during French Revolutionary War. Major Fortye served in Holland (1794), Africa and America; also in Egypt, 1801. He lost his arm in the Battle of Mandora, for which he received a pension.

He then led various Veteran Battalions: 1st Royal Veteran Battalion (by 1805); 6th Royal Veteran Battalion (by April 1807); 3rd Royal Veteran Battalion; 7th Royal Veteran Battalion (by 1 Nov. 1819)

He married Jane Athole Gordon Campbell, daughter of John Campbell, of Melfort, niece of Colin Campbell (British Army officer, born 1776)) at Fort George (1808)[99]

He then held the appointments of Barrack-master in Dublin, Guernsey (1820-1835), and Halifax (March 1835 - 1837), Nova Scotia. He is buried in the Old Burying Ground (Halifax, Nova Scotia).
