= Antoine-Guillaume Rampon =

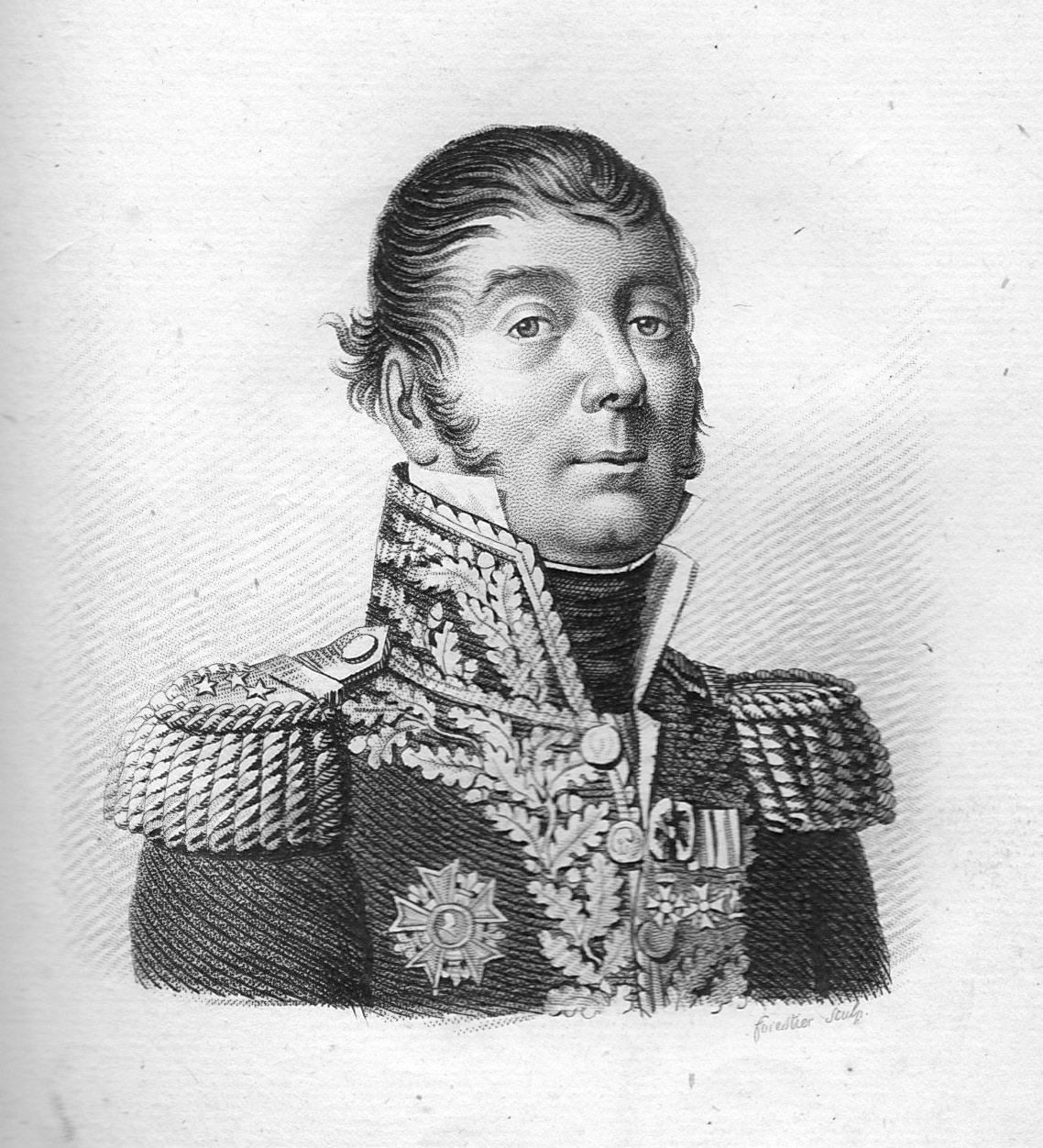
- Antoine-Guillaume Rampon
- Born: 16 March 1759; Saint-Fortunat-sur-Eyrieux, France
- Died: 2 March 1842 (aged 82) Paris, France
- Allegiance: France
- Rank: General of Division
- Conflicts: French Revolutionary Wars; Italian campaigns of the French Revolutionary Wars; Battle of Montenotte; Second Battle of Dego; Battle of Lonato; Battle of Castiglione; Battle of Rovereto; Battle of Arcole; Siege of Mantua (1796-1797); Battle of Rivoli; French invasion of Egypt and Syria; Battle of the Pyramids; Siege of El Arish; Siege of Jaffa; Battle of Mount Tabor (1799); Siege of Acre (1799); Battle of Heliopolis (1800); Battle of Alexandria (1801)

Antoine-Guillaume Rampon (16 March 1759 – 2 March 1842) was a French Army officer who served in the French Revolutionary and Napoleonic Wars. He fought in many battles under Napoleon in Italy and Egypt. In one celebrated battle, he rallied his troops to defend the key Monte Negino redoubt against the Austrians. He saw limited service during the Napoleonic Wars. His surname can be found among the names inscribed under the Arc de Triomphe.

== Early career ==
Born on 16 March 1759 in Saint-Fortunat-sur-Eyrieux in Ardèche department, Rampon joined the French royal army in 1775. By the outbreak of the French Revolution he attained the rank of sergeant-major. In 1792, he was promoted to sous-lieutenant and fought against the Kingdom of Piedmont-Sardinia. Posted to the Army of the Eastern Pyrenees, he was appointed chef de brigade (colonel) and fought in the War of the Pyrenees. Taken prisoner by the Spanish near Port-Vendres in December 1793, he remained incarcerated until October 1795.

== Italian campaign ==
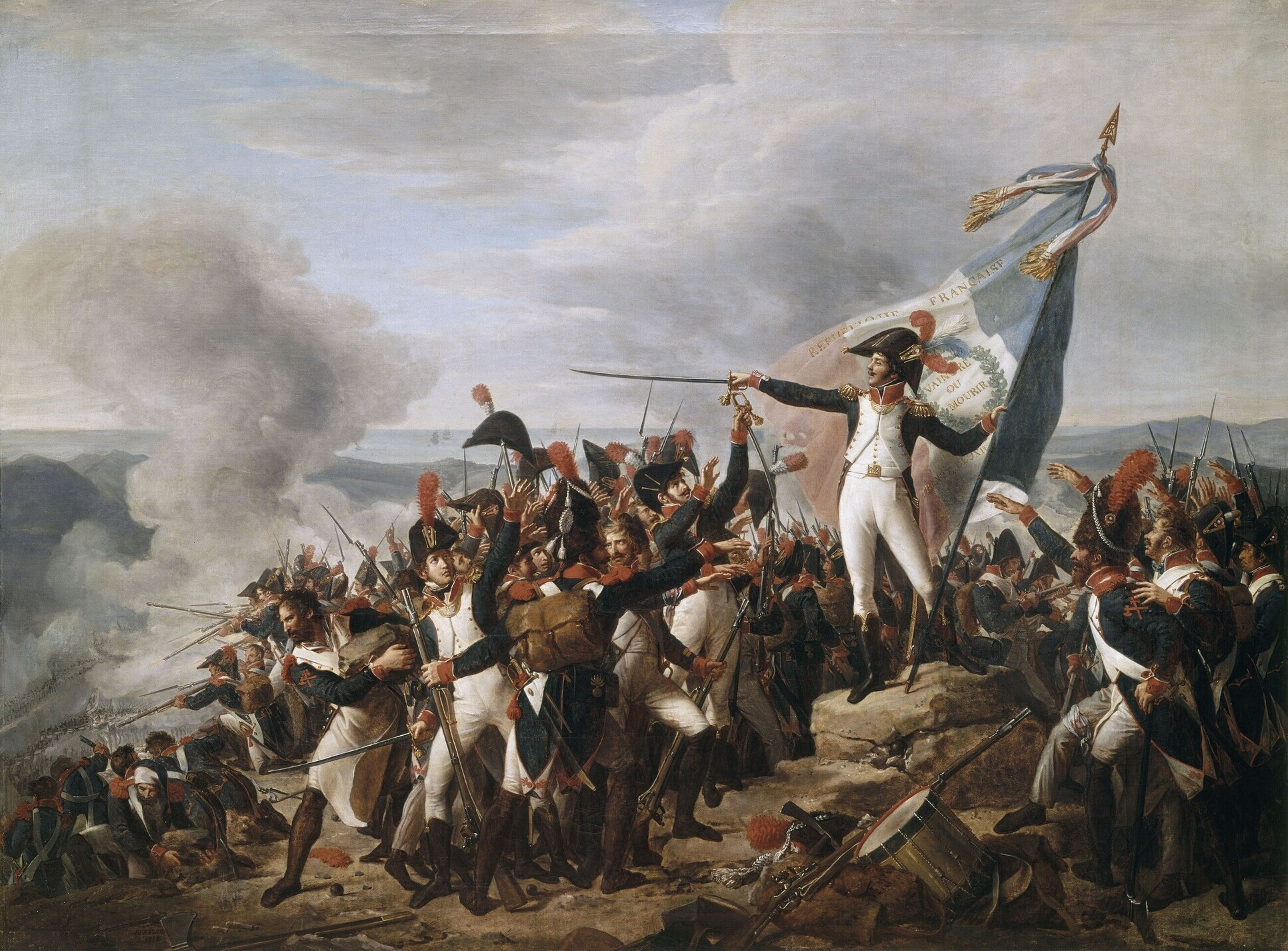
1812 painting of Rampon during the Battle of Montenotte

In November 1795, Rampon was named commander of what soon became the 32nd Demi-Brigade. During the Montenotte campaign he gained fame by his defense of Monte Negino (or Legino) on 11 April 1796, where his soldiers repelled the attacks of a superior Austrian force. He rallied his men by making them swear an oath to "conquer or die". The next day, he led his demi-brigade at the Battle of Montenotte, and later in the week he fought at the Second Battle of Dego. For his actions, General Bonaparte appointed him a brevet general of brigade.

While in André Masséna's division, Rampon played a major role at the battles of Lonato and Castiglione in August. On another occasion, he took care to protect local villagers from marauding French soldiers, according to one account. On 4 September he led the 32nd demi-brigade at the Battle of Rovereto. On 15 September he fought in the action of La Favorita-San Giorgio during the Siege of Mantua. He performed "particularly well at Arcola where his men repelled a counterattack." He also led his demi-brigade at the Battle of Rivoli on 14 January 1797 and in the clash at La Favorita two days later. He was described by Louis Desaix as, "square figure ... not a thief, big, leans backward; very dark skin".

== Egyptian campaign ==
After fighting in Switzerland under Guillaume Brune in 1798, where he Forced the crossing of Gümmenen, he joined Bonaparte's Egyptian expedition. During this episode, he fought at the Battle of the Pyramids, the Siege of El Arish, the Siege of Jaffa, the Battle of Mount Tabor and the Siege of Acre. After the latter action, he assumed command of the division when its commander Louis Bon was killed. After Bonaparte abandoned the army, Rampon participated in the Battle of Heliopolis in March 1800. During the Battle of Alexandria on 21 March 1801, he led the French center. He returned to France in 1801, having been named a general of division in 1800. In 1802 he took a seat in the Senate and retired from the army.

== Empire and Restoration ==
During the Napoleonic Wars, Emperor Napoleon placed Rampon in several positions of trust. He became a Count of the Empire in 1808 and commanded the Camp of Boulogne in 1809. In 1814 he held the fortress of Gorinchem (Gorkum) in the present-day Netherlands until 7 February, when he was compelled to surrender to the Prussians.

Rampon rallied to Napoleon during the Hundred Days and thereafter the Bourbons held him in ill-favor until 1819 when his noble title was restored. He died on 2 March 1842 in Paris. The name RAMPON is engraved on Column 24 of the Arc de Triomphe in Paris.

Rampon's son, Joachim Rampon (1805–1883), was a Deputy of Ardèche during the July Monarchy and again in the French Third Republic, and then was a Senator of Ardèche from 1876 until his death.

== Sources ==
- Boycott-Brown, Martin. The Road to Rivoli. London: Cassell & Co., 2001. ISBN 0-304-35305-1
- Chandler, David. Dictionary of the Napoleonic Wars. New York: Macmillan, 1979. ISBN 0-02-523670-9
- Smith, Digby. The Napoleonic Wars Data Book. London: Greenhill, 1998. ISBN 1-85367-276-9
- Robert, Adolphe; Cougny, Gaston (1889–1891), "RAMPON (JOACHIM-ACHILLE, COMTE)", in Edgar Bourloton (ed.), Dictionnaire des Parlementaires français (1789–1889) (in French)
