= La Forge =

La Forge, LaForge, or Laforge may refer to:

== Places ==
- La Forge, Vosges, a commune in Vosges, France
- La Forge, Missouri, a community in the United States

== People ==
- Claude LaForge (born 1936) Canadian ice skater
- Ed LaForge (1935–2018), American politician
- Élodie Jacquier-Laforge (born 1978), French politician
- Frank La Forge (1879–1953), American pianist and composer
- Louis de La Forge, 17th-century French philosopher
- Marc Laforge (born 1968), ice hockey player
- Harald Welte, German hacker known as LaForge
- Scooter LaForge (born 1971), American artist

== Fictional characters ==
- Geordi La Forge, a fictional character in the television series Star Trek: The Next Generation and Star Trek: Picard
- Alandra La Forge, a fictional character in the television series Star Trek: Picard, daughter of Geordi
- Sidney La Forge, a fictional character in the television series Star Trek: Picard, daughter of Geordi

== See also ==
- Forge (disambiguation)
- Lafarge (disambiguation)
