= François Lanusse =

French military officer (1772–1801)

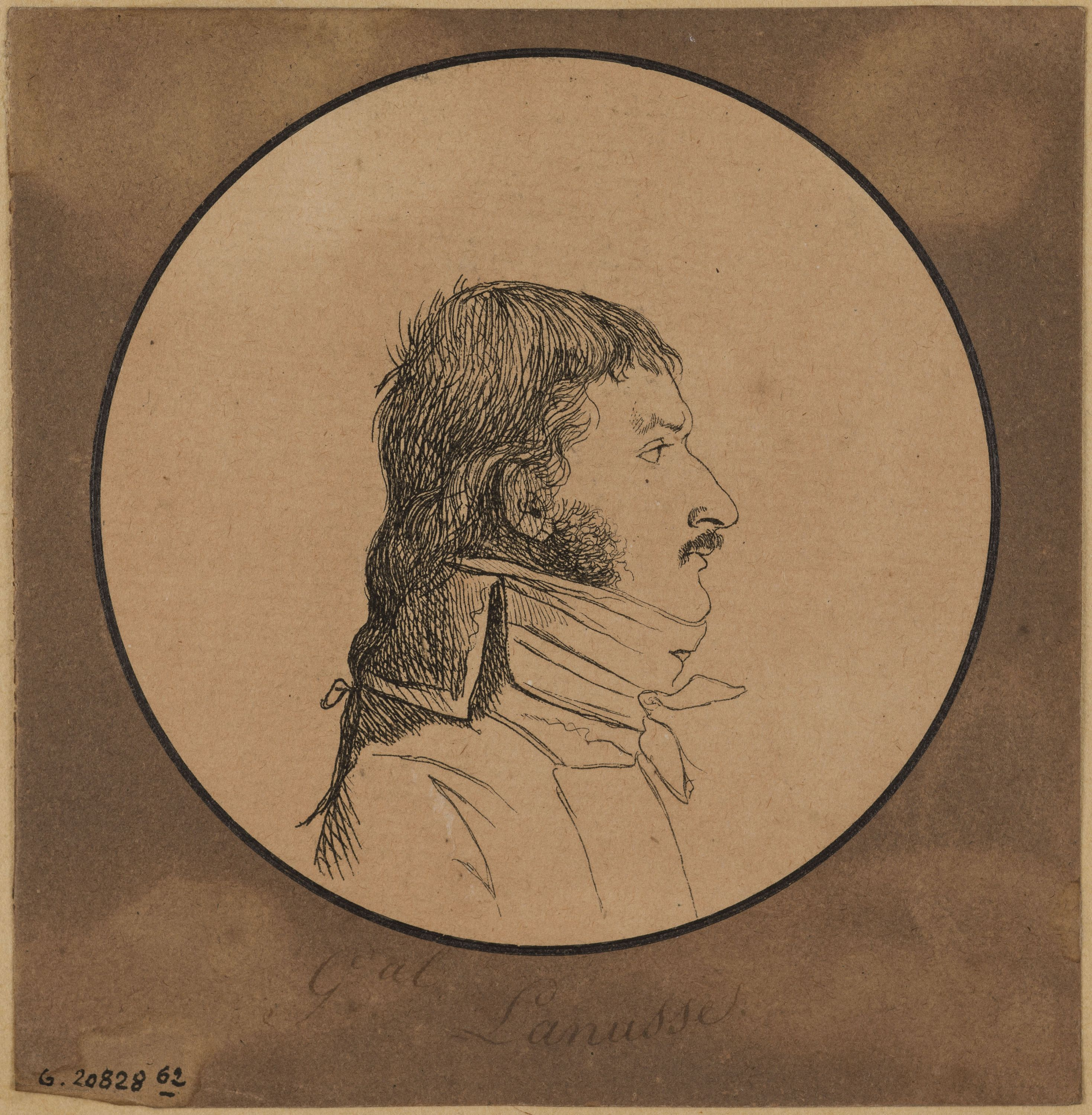
- Portrait by André Dutertre, 1798–1801
- Born: 3 November 1772; Habas, France
- Died: 21 March 1801 (aged 28); Alexandria, Egypt
- Military career
- Allegiance: Kingdom of France; French First Republic
- Branch: National Guard; French Revolutionary Army
- Service years: 1789–1801
- Rank: Divisional general
- Conflicts: French Revolutionary Wars

Divisional-General François Lanusse (3 November 1772 – 21 March 1801) was a French military officer who served in the French Revolutionary Wars. He is best known for his service in the French expedition to Egypt. Lanusse was the commander of the French army at the Battle of Mandora and was killed in action at the Battle of Alexandria in 1801. He was the younger brother of General Pierre Lanusse.

== Biography ==
Lanusse was born in Habas, Gascony on 3 November 1772. He enlisted in the National Guard unit in Agen in 1789 before becoming a lieutenant in the Limoges grenadier company on 8 March 1792. Lanusse joined the 5th Haute-Vienne Battalion on 5 February 1793; his promotions followed rapidly as he became a sergeant on 8 February, a captain on 12 February, and a second lieutenant-colonel on 19 February 1793. Lanusse served in the War in the Vendée in 1793 and subsequently fought in the eastern theater of the War of the Pyrenees from 1793 to 1795. He was promoted to first lieutenant-colonel on 6 September 1793. Under the command of General Sauret, Lanusse fought at the Battle of the Black Mountain from 17 to 20 November 1794, after which he was provisionally appointed adjudant-général (staff colonel) by the representatives on mission on 24 November.

When General Haquin was authorized to recruit additional generals and adjudants-généraux to lead troops to the Army of Italy, Lanusse was assigned to lead one of these columns on 7 March 1796. He served in the Masséna division and distinguished himself at the head of the 8th Light Infantry at the Second Battle of Dego on 15 April. On 27 April 1796, General-in-chief Napoleon Bonaparte provisionally appointed him general of brigade to replace of the deceased general Jean-Jacques Causse, a rank that the Executive Directory confirmed on 1 May 1796. Lanusse became chief of staff to General Dallemagne on 4 May and took command of the 3rd Brigade of the Masséna division on 8 May, serving at the Battle of Fombio on that same day. He served under General Despinoy at the siege of the citadel of Milan on 20 May and commanded the light infantry of the Augereau division at Primolano in September. Lanusse was severely wounded by a saber blow at the battle of the Brenta and taken prisoner on 6 November 1796. After his release, he was given command of a brigade in the Victor division on 26 February 1797 and became the commander of Toulon on 19 September.

=== Egyptian campaign ===
Designated for the Army of England on 12 January 1798, Lanusse was instead sent to the Army of the Orient, departing from Toulon on the dispatch boat Le Vif on 27 June. He disembarked at Alexandria on 25 July and was appointed governor of the province of Menouf, replacing General Zajączek, on 28 August. Lanusse scored a victory at Mit Ghamr on 28 September and defeated Mamluk forces alongside Murat at Mit El Haroun and Gabal el-Tell on 29 September. He recaptured Damanhur from Egyptian insurgents on 9 May 1799 and defeated the agitator El Modhy at Kafr El-Nogoum on 6 June.

Attached to the Rampon division on 20 July, Lanusse served at the Battle of Abukir on 25 July. He returned to the province of Menouf on 27 July and was made commander of Damietta in October 1799. Lanusse received orders to move from Alexandria to Cairo with all his troops on 8 January 1800. There, he replaced General Friant in command of the mobile columns assigned to cover Cairo. Kléber provisionally appointed him general of division on 26 January 1800, and a decree of the Consuls confirmed this rank on 6 September 1800.

Lanusse arrived at El Rahmaniya on 8 March 1801, where he rejoined Friant and attempted to halt the British advance near Lake Maadieh. Outnumbered and slightly wounded, he was forced to retreat on 13 March at the Battle of Mandora. Lanusse later commanded the left flank of the French army at the Battle of Alexandria, in eastern Alexandria, where he attacked the British redoubts. He successfully rallied General Valentin's retreating brigade and led it back into the charge, but was mortally wounded when his left knee was shattered by a musket ball. Having undergone amputation on the battlefield, he died two hours later on 21 March 1801. Lanusse's name is inscribed on the south side of the Arc de Triomphe in Paris.
