= Battle of Abukir (1799) =

1799 battle of the French invasion of Egypt and Syria

- Part of the French invasion of Egypt and Syria
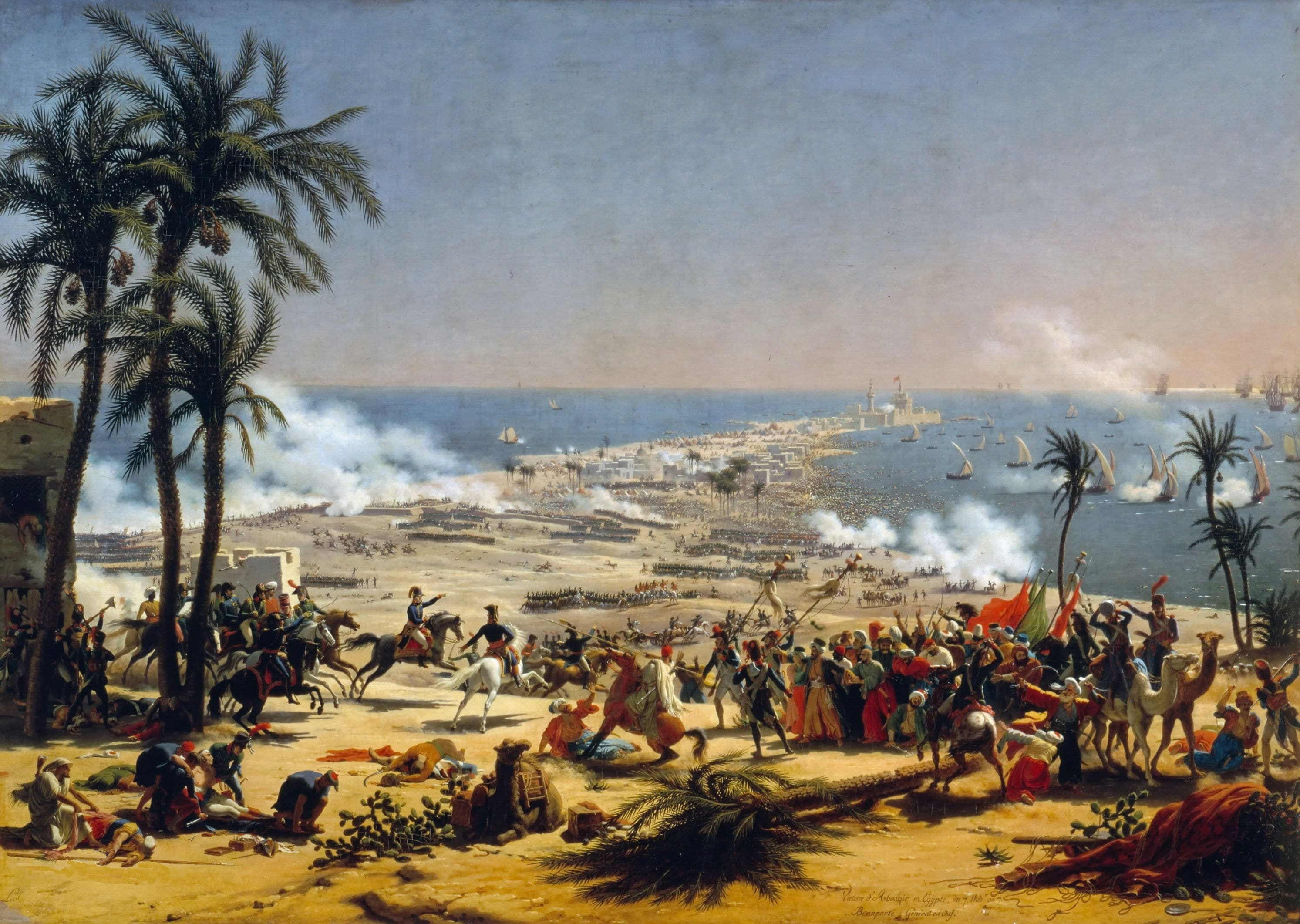
- Battle of Aboukir (1804)
Date	25 July 1799
Location	Abu Qir, Ottoman Egypt 31°19′N 30°04′E
Result	French victory

Belligerents
France	Ottoman Empire; Great Britain

Commanders and leaders
(French First Republic) Napoleon Bonaparte (French First Republic) Joachim Murat (WIA) (French First Republic) Géraud Duroc (WIA) (French First Republic) Jean Lannes (WIA) (French First Republic) François Lanusse (French First Republic) Jacques-François Menou	(Ottoman Empire) Mustafa Pasha (POW) (Ottoman Empire) Patrona Bey (Ottoman Empire) Hassan Bey (Kingdom of Great Britain) Sidney Smith

Strength
9,000 infantry 1,000 cavalry 17 guns	20,000; 30 guns (Estimates attributed to Napoleon and Bourrienne.) 7,000–8,000 (Estimates attributed to Mustafa Pasha and Sidney Smith.)

Casualties and losses
220 killed 600 wounded	2,000 killed 11,000 drowned 5,000 captured 2,000 missing
- Location within Mediterranean Battle of Abukir (1799) (Earth)

The Battle of Abukir (also known as the Battle of Aboukir or Battle of Abu Qir) was fought on 25 July 1799 between the French Army of the Orient under Napoleon Bonaparte and an Ottoman army under Mustafa Pasha during the French invasion of Egypt and Syria. It is considered the first pitched battle with this name, as there already had been a naval battle on 1 August 1798, the Battle of the Nile. (A second pitched battle followed on 8 March 1801.)

No sooner had the French forces returned from a campaign to Syria, than the Ottoman forces were transported to Egypt by an Anglo-Ottoman fleet under Sidney Smith to put an end to French rule in Egypt. Mustafa Pasha was an experienced commander who had fought against the Russians. He knew that cavalry charges against the French squares were futile. So, he sought to avoid them by fortifying his beachhead with two defensive lines. From this beachhead the Pasha could carry out the invasion of Egypt. However, Napoleon immediately saw the flaw in the tactic as it meant that the Ottomans had nowhere to run if routed.

The French attacked the Ottoman positions and quickly broke through the first defensive line before it was fully completed. The second line, however, proved tougher to defeat and the French withdrew for a while. At this point, cavalry general Murat saw his opportunity and attacked with his cavalry, quickly routing the exposed Ottomans. Murat's charge was so rapid that he burst inside the Pasha's tent and captured him, severing two of his fingers with his sabre. In return, Mustafa Pasha shot Murat in the jaw. Immediately, Murat was operated on and resumed his duties the next day.

The Ottoman army fled in panic. Some Ottomans drowned trying to swim to the British ships 2 miles (3.2 km) away from shore, while others fled to Abukir castle, but they surrendered shortly thereafter. The Ottoman army was annihilated, while French losses were under 1,000. News of the victory reached France before Napoleon arrived in October and this made him even more popular, an important asset considering the troubles brewing in the French Directory. This battle temporarily secured France's control over Egypt.

== Background ==
Although nominally part of the Ottoman Empire, Egypt had been ruled as a semi-autonomous province for centuries, and its potential occupation by France had been under discussion since 1774. In early 1798, Napoleon proposed its annexation as part of a wider plan to weaken British interests in Asia. He hoped to use Egypt as the first step in taking Constantinople, then to invade India and attack British possessions there. This was duly approved, and in July 1798, a French expeditionary force of over 40,000 landed in Alexandria.

With British support, the Ottomans now declared war on France, and in 1799 sent two armies to recapture Egypt. One of these was transported by the Royal Navy, while the other marched down the Syrian coast. Napoleon took the initiative and marched north in February 1799, taking Gaza City, El Arish, and Jaffa, but was then held up at Acre for over two months. The defence was led by Djezzar Pasha, the Ottoman governor, assisted by Antoine de Phélippeaux, an engineer and master of artillery who had studied with Napoleon at the École militaire but was now a British colonel. The city was continually replenished with supplies by the Royal Navy, and with his own forces decimated by the plague, Napoleon withdrew, ending plans to capture Constantinople.

On 14 July a British fleet of sixty ships landed with 16,000 men under the command of Mustafa Pasha, a veteran of the last Russo-Turkish War. The Ottoman troops overran an encampment of 300 French soldiers near Aboukir and slaughtered them, then set siege on the fortress of Aboukir – which was garrisoned by a skeletal force of 35 French troops. These troops would surrender 3 days later. The peninsula changed hands and Ottoman flags fluttered on the bastion. Proud of this success, Mustafa Pasha was in no hurry to march on Cairo. Murad Bey, who had managed to escape and join him, said, "The French dreaded that you could not support the presence, I watch, and they are fleeing before me." and Murad replied, "Pasha, be glad that it suits the French to withdraw because if they turned, you would disappear before them like dust before the north wind."

Napoleon previously received reports that Murad Bey was riding due north, passing the Natron lakes west of Cairo, he ordered Murat out to pursue him. But the bey returned to Giza and climbed the Pyramids, and using a mirror, "sent several signals to his wife" (who was observing him from the roof of her palace). Napoleon was not alerted by this, as the bey had only a skeleton force of Mamluks with him, and was worn out to the bone by Desaix's protracted pursuit of him through Upper Egypt over the course of the last several months (Murad had been chased squarely out of Egypt, and had been forced to seek refuge in some remote oasis' and prey on Sudanese villages south of Upper Egypt to survive). When Napoleon received (at the time he was several miles northwest of Cairo, participating in the hunt of Murad bey) a report from Marmont, then military-governor of Alexandria, on July 15, reporting that a large Anglo-Ottoman fleet had arrived off Aboukir and disembarked 10,000 troops, Napoleon wasted no time and sent several dispatches. He ordered Murat to stop the pursuit of Murad bey and to converge to Damanhur, located 40 miles (64 km) south of Aboukir. Jean-Baptiste Kléber was to set out with his division from the eastern Delta for Damanhur as well, Desaix was to march down the Nile with as much of his division as possible to provide a reserve in case the Ottoman army marched on Cairo. Napoleon set out with almost all the French troops in Cairo for Damanhur as well, leaving the city to be policed and garrisoned only by his local Egyptian 'police chief', a man known as "Barthelemy". Marmont was ordered by Napoleon to remain in Alexandria with his 1,200 troops, in case the Ottoman army marched upon it.^{p. 392}

Napoleon assembled 10,000 infantry and 1,000 cavalry at Damanhur. He was greatly concerned that the Ottoman army would march out of the Peninsula and attack anywhere in Egypt, so he set out immediately with his army without waiting for Kléber. He arrived near Aboukir in 24 July and was relieved to find the Ottoman army lying in wait. Napoleon had to reassess his plans; according to his intelligence, the enemy commander was the white-bearded Pasha. A leader who had won several victories against the Russians in the last Russo-Turkish War. This was to be a different battle than those with the Mamluks, one against a commander who had experience against European armies. Mustafa Pasha knew of Napoleon's strengths; his superlative tactics, decisiveness in speed and the imperviousness of his squares. He nullified these advantages by fortifying his army in two strong defensive lines along the peninsula, with both his flanks anchored on the shores. This protected him from flanking action, and also forced the French to attack on his own terms. Napoleon approached Abukir with the divisions of Lannes, Desaix and Murat's cavalry, 7,700 men and 1,000 horsemen, and the Ottomans had 15,000-18,000 men, 8,000 of whom were in a condition to fight. According to François Furet and Denis Richet ("French Revolution", Macmillan 1970, XI-14). According to the Pasha, corroborated by British officer Sidney Smith, this number was actually only 7,000 men.^{p. 396} The clash between the two armies took place near Alexandria, but the victorious French called it "the battle of Abu Qir" (or Aboukir) to avenge the former defeat of 1–3 August 1798.

== Battle ==
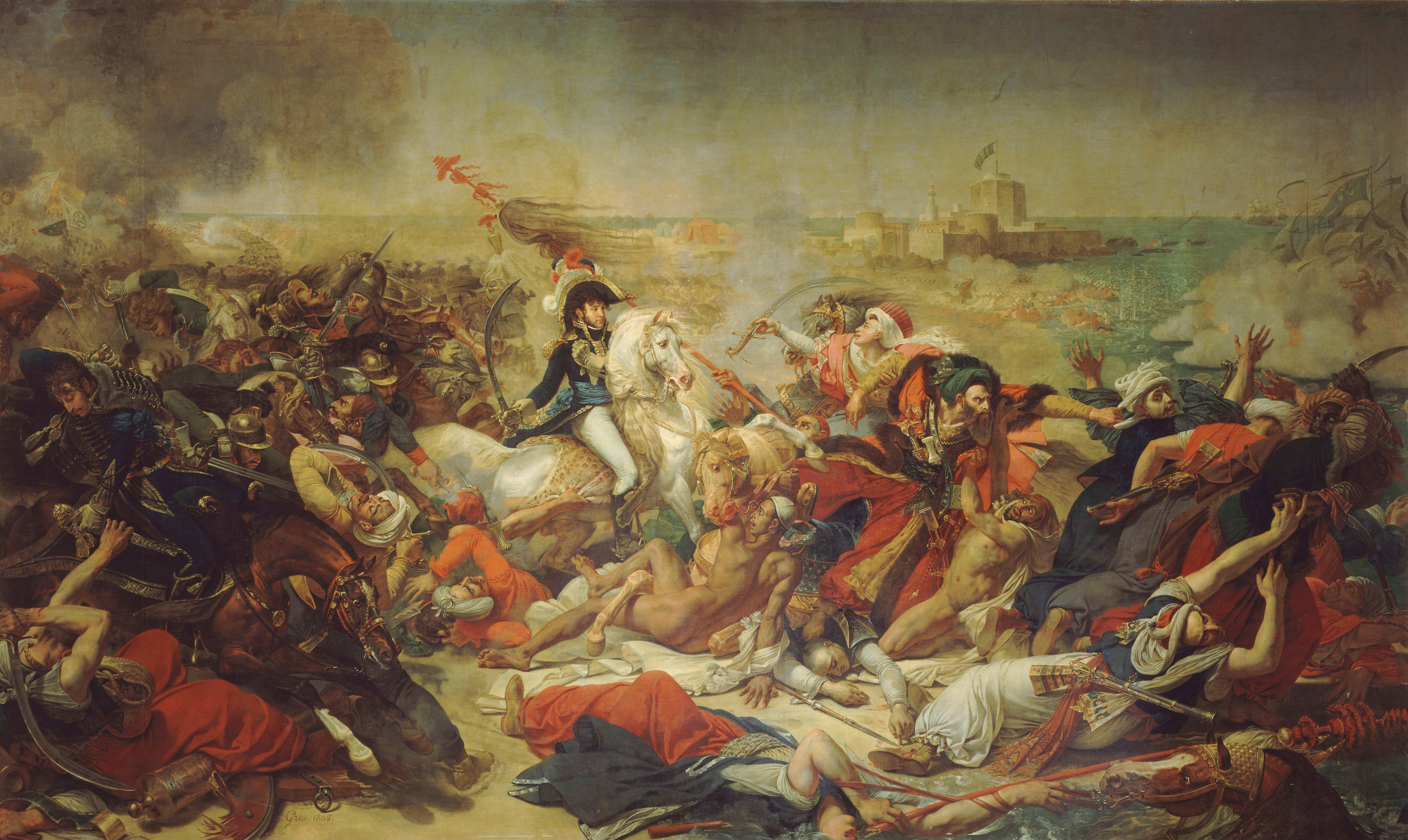
Battle of Abukir, 25 July 1799 by Antoine-Jean Gros, 1806

Napoleon camped his army for the night of the 24th, the next morning on 25 July he ordered an attack on the Ottoman army. Mustafa Pasha arranged his army in two strongly defended lines with both flanks anchored in the shores of the peninsula. Lanusse's division was placed on the left French flank, while Lannes' division was placed on the right. Murat was in the vanguard with his cavalrymen. The Ottoman fortifications and trenches on the western flank, facing Lanusse, were still unfinished, and the division under Lanusse managed to break through the Ottoman line after ferocious fighting. Lannuse took advantage of the rout on the Ottoman right flank to swing around and behind the left flank of the first enemy defensive line. This caused widespread panic among the defending Ottomans on the left flank, without anywhere to retreat, many took to the water and attempted to swim to the nearest Ottoman and British ships, where almost all of them drowned. According to Napoleon,

The enemy threw themselves into the water in an attempt to reach the boats which were more than 2 miles (3.2 km) out at sea; they all drowned, the most horrible sight I've seen.

— Napoleon Bonaparte, Correspondence, Vol 5., p. 541

The French then proceeded to attack the second Ottoman line, which was strongly defended. The French attack, bombarded by Ottoman and British ships, was repulsed, but the western side of the peninsula was poorly supported by the Anglo-Ottoman fleet; two French probing attacks on the eastern side were driven back with British naval gunfire support.^{p. 365} As the French retreated, hundreds of Ottoman troops emerged from their fortifications and set in pursuit of the retreating French, beheading the corpses of dead Frenchmen. After the rout of the Ottoman soldiers defending the first line, Napoleon contemplated moving his artillery batteries to the two hills in front of the second line, which was heavily defended and seemed impervious to attack. But seeing that the western bay of Aboukir extended like a cape, he moved his artillery there. This allowed the French batteries to bombard the Ottomans' right flank. The Ottomans maneuvered their right flank slightly inland, leaving a small gap in their line. At this juncture, Murat saw an opportunity with an opening in the Ottoman line and numerous Ottoman soldiers emerging out of the protection of their fortifications to mutilate the French dead, and charged his cavalry at the scattered Ottomans. A wave of panic spread through the Ottoman army, all the way to their defensive lines, and within minutes Murat found himself charging deep into the Ottoman encampment, where he found Mustafa Pasha's tent. The Pasha emerged before Murat and fired a pistol at him, wounding him in the jaw. Murat swung his sabre at the Pasha's right hand, cutting off two of his fingers and ordered his men to seize him.

Outside the Pasha's tent, the mayhem did not cease, and the Ottoman army had broken into a complete rout and thousands of soldiers were fleeing to the sea on both sides of the Peninsula. A few thousand Ottoman troops retreated northwards and took refuge inside the fort of Aboukir, these included the Pasha's son. These troops were reinforced by a detachment of British marines which Sidney dispatched from HMS Tigre. The French bombarded the fort day and night, and the Ottoman officers soon agreed to surrender, but their troops mutinied against this, having heard of the massacre of Ottoman prisoners captured by the French in the siege of Jaffa.

Napoleon at this stage left for Alexandria and gave charge of the siege to Lannes. Mustafa Pasha, who was now a captive of the French, wrote multiple dispatches to the beleaguered Ottomans, ordering them to surrender, this was refused and the survivors of the battle swore to defend the fort to their last extremity. The Pasha's second letter to the besieged Ottomans chided them for their continued resistance, which was spilling more blood needlessly, at this juncture the besieged Ottomans agreed to a ceasefire. The French colonel in charge of the engineers, Bertrand used the advantage of this ceasefire to reconnoiter the fort, but a firefight broke out subsequently. The Ottomans sallied out of the fort and captured a few houses in front of it, Lannes wanted to counterattack and drive them back, but he was dissuaded from this by Bertrand, who wisely stated that even if these buildings were retaken, it would cost the French more troops when the Ottomans try to recapture them, and advised Lannes to wait a few days until the digging of siege trenches was complete, which would force the Ottoman soldiers back inside the fort, and the siege would ideally cost no casualties to the French. The Ottomans, encouraged by their small success, made another sortie and captured more buildings in the village on June 28. And after this, even made a sortie on French positions on Sheikh hill.

Lannes could not hold back anymore and ordered an attack to drive the Ottomans back into the fort. During the fighting, he was wounded with a musket ball, and had to be evacuated. General Menou (military governor of Rosetta at the time) then took command of the siege. The Ottomans then made yet another sortie, capturing a bridgehead to the fort. Davout, who was in the siege trenches, attacked the Ottomans and drove them out of the village back inside the fortress. At the 30th, two batteries of heavy guns and three batteries of mortars came into action and began bombarding the fort, while at the night of the 30th French sappers began mining below the fort to mine and blow up the counterscarp. But at 2 August, at dawn, the Ottomans crowded out of their fort, without any envoy of capitulation. The Ottoman troops were starved, and many became delirious and half-crazed from drinking seawater over the course of the siege. After holding out for 8 days, they simply walked out en-masse and asked for mercy. Of their surrender, the French captain Charles François describes the surrender;

They came out to offer themselves up to the vengeance of their victors. The son of the Pasha and his lieutenants came out at the head of the Turkish soldiers, who looked like ghosts. They threw down their arms that they no longer had the strength to carry, and all of them bowed down, asking for death. But our commanders and soldiers, forgetting their previous hatred of the enemy, felt for them all the compassion and care evoked by their deplorable state. We gave them food and drink, and in spite of the precautions taken to prevent the illness that comes from eating too much too quickly after having suffered from hunger, three-quarters of those 3,000 men died of indigestion.

— Charles François, Journal du capitaine François dit le "Dromadaire d'Egypte", P.359

== Aftermath ==
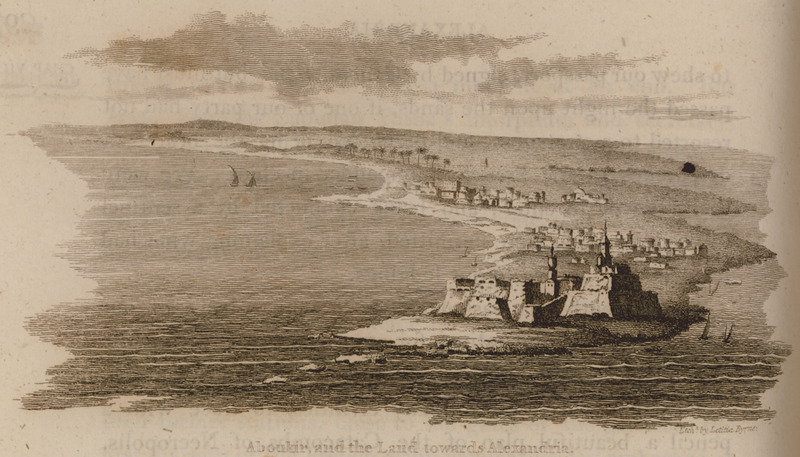
Aboukir fort and peninsula, as it was in 1813.

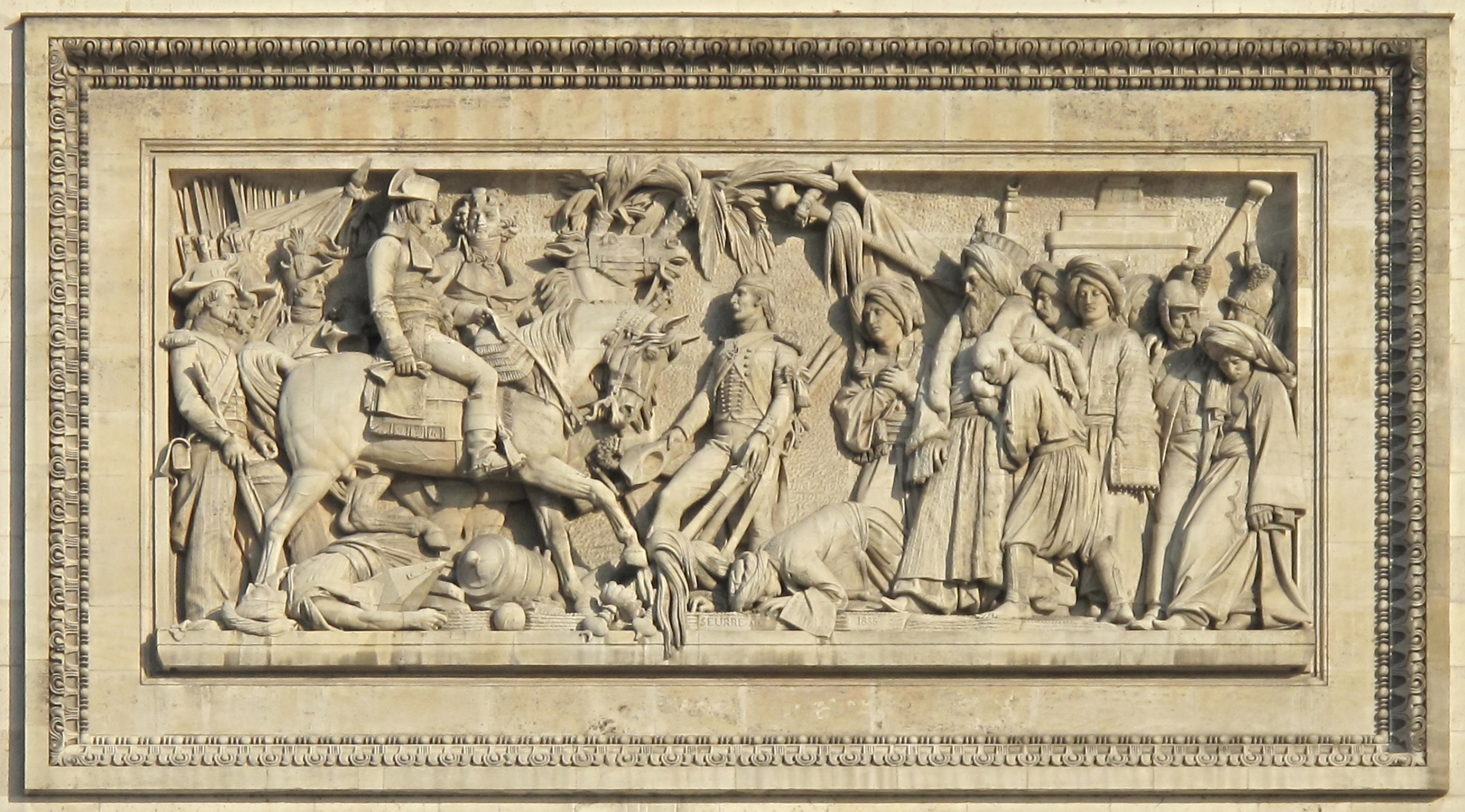
"The Battle of Aboukir", relief by Bernard Seurre on the South Façade of the Arc de Triomphe, Paris.

Smith dispatched a letter to Horatio Nelson, on 2 August, informing him of the defeat, writing;^{Page 364}

I am sorry to have to acquaint your lordship of the entire defeat of the first division of the Ottoman army, destined to act against the enemy in Egypt, under the command of his excellency Mustapha Serasker, who is wounded and taken prisoner, after having defended himself gallantly, and wounded General Murat, who took him. However, under these untoward circumstances, we have the satisfaction of observing the enemy's loss to be such, that a few more victories like this will annihilate the French army. It is much to be lamented that we had not two regular regiments, in addition to the remnant of the Chiflick (sic) corps, which was almost entirely cut to pieces for want of support; we should then have been able to have kept the redoubt and castle of Aboukir, which Mustapha Pasha and Patrona Bey took by assault, on the 15th ultimo; as it was, the unformed mass of irregular infantry could not withstand the spirited at-tack of a small body of French cavalry, which leaped over the works after having been three times repulsed by the effect of our cannon. On my arrival, five days after the disembarkation, I found the Turkish army in a very different position from that in which I hoped to find it, from the correspondence which had passed between Mustapha Pasha and me; and much less considerable, being but 5,000 men instead of 15,000, as had been reported. Hassan Bey, who came with me, had but 2,000, and as Buonaparte was at Rahmania, an attack was to be expected immediately; it was therefore the more necessary to make the best of our ground. The Turks are not easily brought to quit their arms for entrenching tools, of which they only begin to see the utility; thus the attempt at making lines across the peninsula, from the redoubt to the sea on each side, was very imperfect. The gun-boats were ordered to take a station to flank these lines, but there was no stimulating their crews to any degree of exertion in the transporting of them, and thus the enemy had less fire opposed to them than might have been produced, had the division destined for the west side of the Isthmus reached its station. The English rowing boats alone went there, after completely clearing the east side from the enemy, and we felt the insufficiency of our fire so much the more, since even that made a considerable impression on the blue column as it advanced to the assault; it was even repulsed twice, but the barbarous custom of the Turks, in cutting off the heads of their fallen enemies, to effect which they ran forward irregularly, produced a burst of indignation amongst the French infantry, which rallied them; the suddenness of their return to the assault discomfited the unconnected defenders of these imperfect lines; the sea was soon covered with hundreds of fugitives swimming off to us, and the castle on the point became too much crowded for it to be practicable for the besieged to act in its defence, or for us to supply such a numerous garrison....

— Sir William Sidney Smith, Letter to Lord Nelson, August 2nd 1799 off Aboukir bay. The life and correspondence of Admiral Sir William Sidney Smith, G.C.B., p.364

The French suffered only 220 dead and 600 wounded while the Ottoman losses were enormous: 2,000 dead on the battlefield, 11,000 men drowned, 5,000 prisoners of war and 2,000 missing and unaccounted for. Napoleon would claim that "of the enemy who came ashore, not a single one escaped." This was not true, as Smith dispatched some boats to rescue some of the Ottomans who ran into the waters. Among the Ottomans rescued from the water was thirty-year-old officer of Albanian descent Muhammed Ali, who six years later would rule and transform Egypt.

On the main battlefield, the French captured 100 Ottoman banners, 32 field guns, 400 horses and three Pasha's Bunchuks (ceremonial flags issued to Pashas). The captured cannons included two small British artillery pieces which had been presented on behalf of George III as a gift to Selim III. These cannons were given to a French cavalry brigade. For his gallant charge and capture of the Pasha, Napoleon promoted Murat to divisional general, and gave him great credit for the victory at Aboukir. Lannes was also promoted to divisional general, and Bertrand to the rank of colonel.

Smith, leading the British fleet, wrote the following to be "Causes of the defeat of the Ottoman army under Mustapha Pasha Serasker on 25 July 1799;^{Page 367}

1st. The primary cause was the original formation of the army under feudal chiefs, without connection in its parts, organisation, or gradation in rank.

2nd. Its being far less in number than supposed and reported, and certainly unequal to undertaking the siege of Alexandria, consequently fit only to carry on a harassing war of posts, under the protection of the naval force, to cause a division in favour of the Vizier, and facilitate his uninterrupted progress into Egypt by the way of the desert.

3rd. The Pasha not having listened to the advice on this head, sent him by Sir Sidney Smith, through Major Bromley, which pointed out Damietta and Rosetta as the stations to which his forces should be directed, while the fleet occupied the Bay of Aboukir being not only a powerful diversion, but likewise conductive to the blockade and reduction of Alexandria by famine, which, now that it is strongly fortified, is the only way that an army, unused to the European mode of carrying on a siege, can attempt it.

4th. The want of water, owing to want of casks in the transports, and even in the Turkish men-of-war, which rendered the disembarkation on the first point of the coast of Egypt which they reached, an object of unavoidable necessity, and occasioned the extreme of distress for want of that indispensable article, when the army had retreated into the castle, where the single well furnishes only brackish water, although the Peninsula furnishes good water wherever wells are sunk.

5th. The backwardness of the Turkish gun-boats, which were ordered to take a commanding station to the westward of the Isthmus, but which never arrived there; also the inefficacy of the Turkish launches, which were ordered to possess themselves of the lake, and cross their fire on the Isthmus with them.

6th. The absolute denial of the Turkish launches to accompany the English commodore when he went with his boats to the westward, after having cleared the east side of the Peninsula of every Frenchman, so that when the English boats came round and found the French infantry lodged and crouched amongst the sand-banks on the shore, and totally exposed to the sea, their fire, though well served and directed into the mass of them, being from two guns only, was insufficient for their destruction, or to keep them in check, and consequently rather goaded them on than otherwise; the four gun-boats would have effectually hindered their approach to the redoubt, and covered the retreat of the Chiflick regiment from the village in front; the Turkish launches would have checked the enemy sufficiently for the Turks to rally; finally, there being no prompt punishment for disobedience of orders, nor any immediate successor to the principal chief, in case of his death, capture, absence, illness, or excess of fatigue; and in short, such a want of gradation in the distribution of ranks, that it is indispensably necessary for the principal chief to super-intend the execution of the most trifling service him-self, to the ultimate prejudice of his authority on greater questions where every one pretends to decide. The mutinous spirit of their army was carried so far as to produce the actual arrest of the governor and principal personages in the castle, and increased the difficulty of supplying their wants, as, in the disorder, they forced the boats which brought water to them to return with fugitives, firing on those who approached with necessary caution, fearing to be overpowered with more than they could bear.

Abukir gave the French a few months respite. Desaix continued through Upper Egypt in search of Murad Bey, who would soon accept a conditional peace with the French and ally himself with them.

Napoleon learned from the Pasha of the situation in Europe, where a large coalition was threatening France. (he had been completely in the dark regarding developments in Europe for a long time, due to the British blockade). And an envoy sent to Smith for exchanging prisoners (Napoleon wanted to send the heavily wounded Ottoman prisoners to the Anglo-Ottoman fleet in exchange for the captured French garrison of Aboukir), Smith then handed the French envoy appointed by Napoleon several of the latest newspapers, and verbally told the envoy that the directory had summoned Napoleon back to Paris (he had read the summons letter, which had been intercepted by the British, and presumably was trying to get Napoleon out of Egypt, which would ideally greatly weaken the French position in Egypt). Napoleon read these newspapers, which were more confirmation to the grave situation political situation of France in Europe, where almost all of the Italian territories he conquered were captured by the Austrians, and there was another insurrection in the Vendée. Smith would soon, for reasons that can only be understood as elaborate, lift the blockade of the Egyptian coast and take his fleet for provisioning at an allied port (he would state that his salted provisions were completely exhausted at this stage). This gave Napoleon an opening in which he would be able to escape from Egypt.

On 23 August, leaving the command to Kléber, Napoleon embarked on the frigate Muiron in a small French flotilla under the command of Honoré Joseph Antoine Ganteaume with Berthier, Murat, Lannes and several of his savants (including his favorite, Gaspard Monge). He very secretively prepared to abandon Egypt and go back to France and only informed Kléber with a letter in the very same day he departed, to the great chagrin of his troops and generals who viewed this as nothing short of betrayal (especially Kléber, who would be appalled to see the letters Napoleon dispatched to the Directory, in which he minimized and downplayed the precarious conditions of the expedition. Kléber would dispatch a strong-worded letter to the directory informing them of the reality of the situation).

In the long term, a French presence in Egypt was impossible to maintain. Jean-Antoine Verdier managed to defeat a second Ottoman amphibious assault at Damietta several months later, on 1 November, and Kléber tenuously maintained French rule over the country thanks to his victory at Heliopolis on 18 March 1800, but less than a month later he was murdered in his garden in Cairo by a student of theology. Kléber's successor, Menou, lacking the skills of a war leader, was defeated at Canopus (fought a short distance west of the battlefield of Aboukir, on the isthmus to Alexandria) and surrendered on 2 September on identical conditions that were negotiated and agreed on previously by Kléber, Smith and Grand Vizier Kör Yusuf Ziyaüddin Pasha, but declined and foundered by Prime Minister William Pitt the Younger. Under the convention signed with the British, the French army came back to France in British ships.

The battle has become one of the greatly celebrated victories in French history. It has a plate relief on the Arc de Triomphe, and the Rue D'Aboukir in Paris was named after this victory.

== See also ==
- Battle of the Nile or Battle of Abukir Bay (1798)
- Battle of Abukir (1801)
