= List of senators of Ardèche =

Location of Ardèche in France

Following is a List of senators of Ardèche, people who have represented the department of Ardèche in the Senate of France.

== Third Republic ==
Senators for Ardeche under the French Third Republic were:

- Joachim Rampon (1876–1883)
- Adrien Tailhand (1876–1885)
- Arthur Chalamet (1883–1895)
- Victor Pradal (1885–1910)
- Oscar Soubeyran de Saint-Prix (1892–1903)
- Édouard Fougeirol (1896–1912)
- François Boissy d'Anglas (1903–1912)
- Placide Astier (1910–1918)
- Georges Murat (1912–1918)
- Auguste Vincent (1912–1915)
- Henri Chalamet (1920–1930)
- Isidore Cuminal (1920–1938)
- Édouard Roche (1920–1930)
- Jules Duclaux-Monteil (1930–1939)
- Henri de Pavin de Lafarge (1930–1945)
- Marcel Astier (1939–1945)
- Pierre Lautier (1939–1945)

== Fourth Republic ==
Senators for Ardeche under the French Fourth Republic were:

- Marcel Molle (1946–1959)
- Édouard Sauvertin (1946–1948)
- Franck Chante (1948–1955)
- Alphonse Thibon (1955–1959)

== Fifth Republic ==
Senators for Ardeche under the French Fifth Republic:

- Marcel Molle (1959–1971)
- Paul Ribeyre (1959–1980)
- Pierre Jourdan (1971–1980)
- Bernard Hugo (1980–1998)
- Henri Torre (1980–2008)
- Michel Teston (1998–2014)
- Yves Chastan (2008–2014)
- Jacques Genest (from 2014)
- Mathieu Darnaud (from 2014)

== Sources ==
- Liste des anciens sénateurs de la IIIème République par circonscription (in French), Sénat de France
- Liste des anciens sénateurs de la IVème République par circonscription (in French), Sénat de France
- Liste des anciens sénateurs de la Vème République par circonscription (in French), Sénat de France
- Liste par département – Ardeche (in French), Sénat de France
