= Siege of El Arish =

1799 siege during the French Invasion of Egypt

- Part of the French Campaign in Egypt and Syria of the French Revolutionary Wars
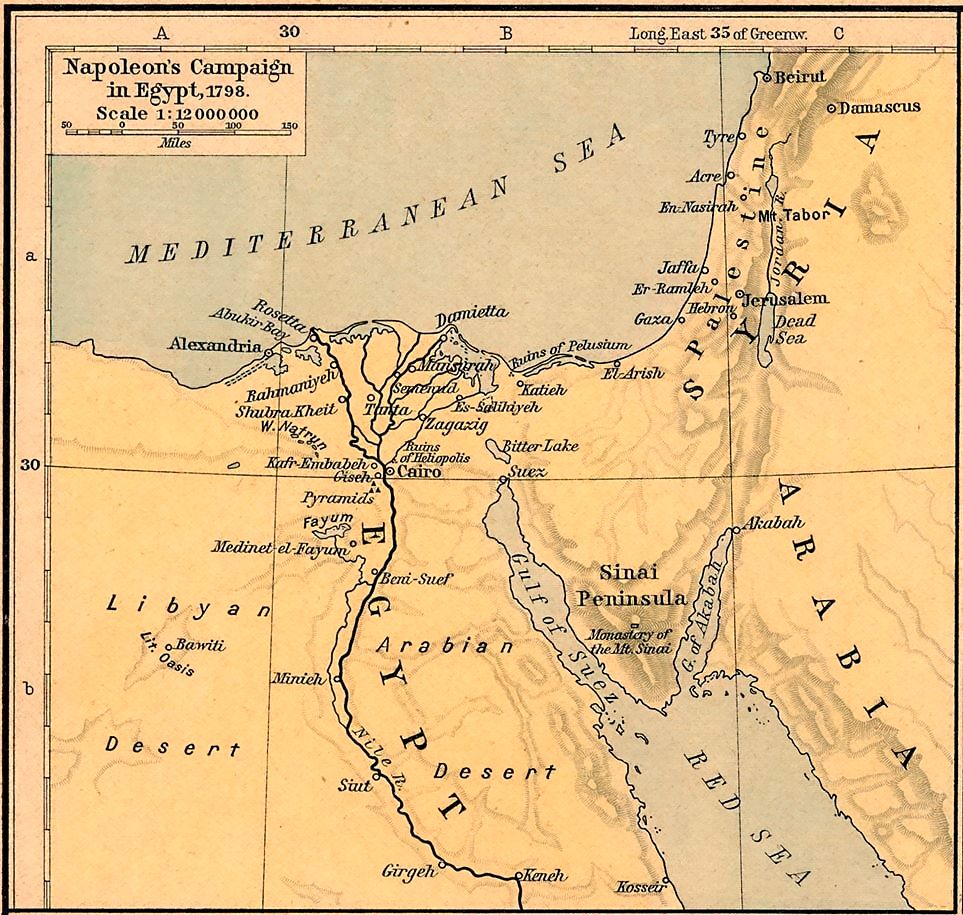
Date	8–20 February 1799
Location	El Arish, Egypt, Ottoman Empire 31.1321°N 33.8034°E
Result	French victory

Belligerents
French Republic	Ottoman Empire; Eyalet of Egypt

Commanders and leaders
(French First Republic) Napoleon Bonaparte (French First Republic) Jean-Baptiste Kléber (French First Republic) Jean Reynier	Abdullah Pasha (POW)

Strength
2,460	15,500

Casualties and losses
403 killed and wounded	1,200 killed and wounded 1,800 captured

The siege of El Arish was a successful siege by French forces under Napoleon Bonaparte against Ottoman forces under Mustafa Pasha. The French army, commanded by Jean Baptiste Kléber and Jean Reynier laid siege to the fortress of El Arish for nine days. The fortress finally fell to the French on 20 February 1799.

== Background ==
Napoleon had recently subdued a revolt against the French occupation in Egypt, and with his borders secure, continued his offensive against the Ottoman Empire. In the beginning of 1799, a force of 2,160 soldiers under the command of Jean Reynier marched towards the Ottoman fortress of El Arish. The fortress contained a total of 15,500 soldiers under the command of Mustafa Pasha.

== Initial skirmish ==
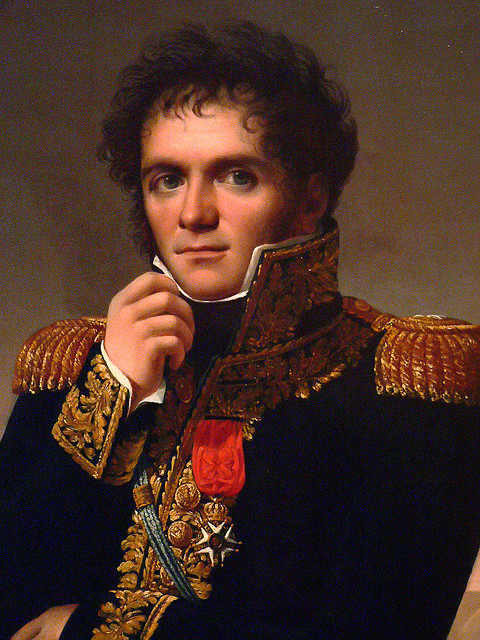
Jean-Louis Reynier

On 8 February 1799, Reynier's troops reached Masoodiah, where French soldiers captured a Mamluk runner who told them that El Arish was under Ottoman control. Reynier sent a courier to Bonaparte calling for immediate reinforcements and took position on a sand hill near El Arish. In response, Ottoman forces moved into a nearby palm forest and obtained supplies and twelve cannons. Their cavalry began skirmishing with French forces. After half an hour of Ottoman artillery fire, Reynier sent French troops to take the village of El Arish. The Ottoman defenders of the village fled and escaped into their fort, and their cavalry withdrew on the road to Gaza under the cover of a defile. All twelve cannons were captured by the French. French lost 3 killed while the Ottomans 450 killed and wounded and 900 captured.

== Siege ==
On 12 February 1799, Kléber's division reached El Arish, and his forces began a siege of the Ottoman fort. Reynier's division moved into position in the palm forest near the defile. On 14 February 1799, Reynier's forces attacked an Ottoman camp, which they successfully captured, suffering 23 casualties. The Ottomans, on the other hand, suffered about 500 killed, along with 900 Ottoman prisoners of war captured by the French. 1,000 soldiers under Ottoman commander Ibrahim Nizam were still inside the fort, however, and after processing captured material, Reynier established a camp from which he also began sieging the fort. Meanwhile, the main body of French forces under Napoleon arrived in El Arish.

On 17 February 1799, Louis Caffarelli du Falga, a brigadier general and commander of the French engineers, began overseeing the construction of siege batteries and fortifications. The following day, the French began artillery fire on the Ottoman fortifications. On 20 February 1799, the French began an assault in which they successfully captured El Arish from the Ottomans, ending the eleven-day siege. After capturing the fort, the French repaired the fortifications that had sustained damage during the siege.

== Aftermath ==
The French had lost 200 killed and 300 wounded. The Ottomans had lost 900 soldiers, with a further 800 being captured. Around 300 of those switched sides and joined the French army when given the opportunity to do so, and the remaining prisoners were moved to cities in Egypt under French command. 40 soldiers who managed to escape settled in Great Britain with the help of British military members sympathetic to their cause.
