= Lafarge =

La Farge, LaFarge or Lafarge can refer to:

== People ==
- Antoinette LaFarge (1966–), American artist and writer
- Christopher Grant LaFarge (1862–1938), American architect and partner in the firm Heins & LaFarge
- Christopher Grant La Farge (author) (1897–1956), American author
- Daisy Lafarge (1992–), British poet and writer
- Guy Lafarge, songwriter for France in the Eurovision Song Contest 1957
- Henri Pavin de Lafarge (1889–1965), French businessman and politician
- Jean-Baptiste Lafarge, actor in La Crème de la crème
- John La Farge (1835–1910), American stained glass artist and writer
- John LaFarge, Jr. (1880–1963), American Jesuit priest
- L. Bancel LaFarge (1900–1989), American architect
- Marie Lafarge (1816–1852), French murderer
- Oliver La Farge (1901–1963), American writer and anthropologist
- Paul La Farge (1970–2023), American novelist
- Peter La Farge (1931–1965), American folk singer
- Pokey LaFarge (1983–), American musician and songwriter

== Fictional characters ==
- Henri LaFarge, butler in A Shot in the Dark
- Kenneth Lafarge, character in the novel Drakon

== Companies ==
- Lafarge (company), French industrial company
- LafargeHolcim, merger of Holcim and Lafarge cement firms
- Lafarge Tarmac, British industrial company

== Places ==
- Gare de Lafarge, a train station in Saint-Hilaire-les-Places, France
- La Farge, a village in Wisconsin, United States
- Lafarge Falls, in Hamilton, Ontario, Canada
- Lafarge Lake, in British Columbia, Canada
- Lafarge Rocks, near the Antarctic Peninsula
- Lafarge Lake–Douglas Station, the SkyTrain terminus station of the Evergreen Line extension to Coquitlam, in Metro Vancouver, Canada
- La Fargeville, New York, a hamlet in New York, United States
