= Forge, Cornwall =

Coordinates: 50.263°N 5.231°W

Forge: Cornish: Govel
- Location within Cornwall
- OS grid reference: SW698453
- Civil parish: Redruth
- Unitary authority: Cornwall
- Ceremonial county: Cornwall
- Region: South West
- Country: England
- Sovereign state: United Kingdom

Forge (Cornish: Govel) is a hamlet in the parish of Redruth, Cornwall, England.
