= Joachim Rampon =

French politician (1805–1883)

Joachim Achille Rampon
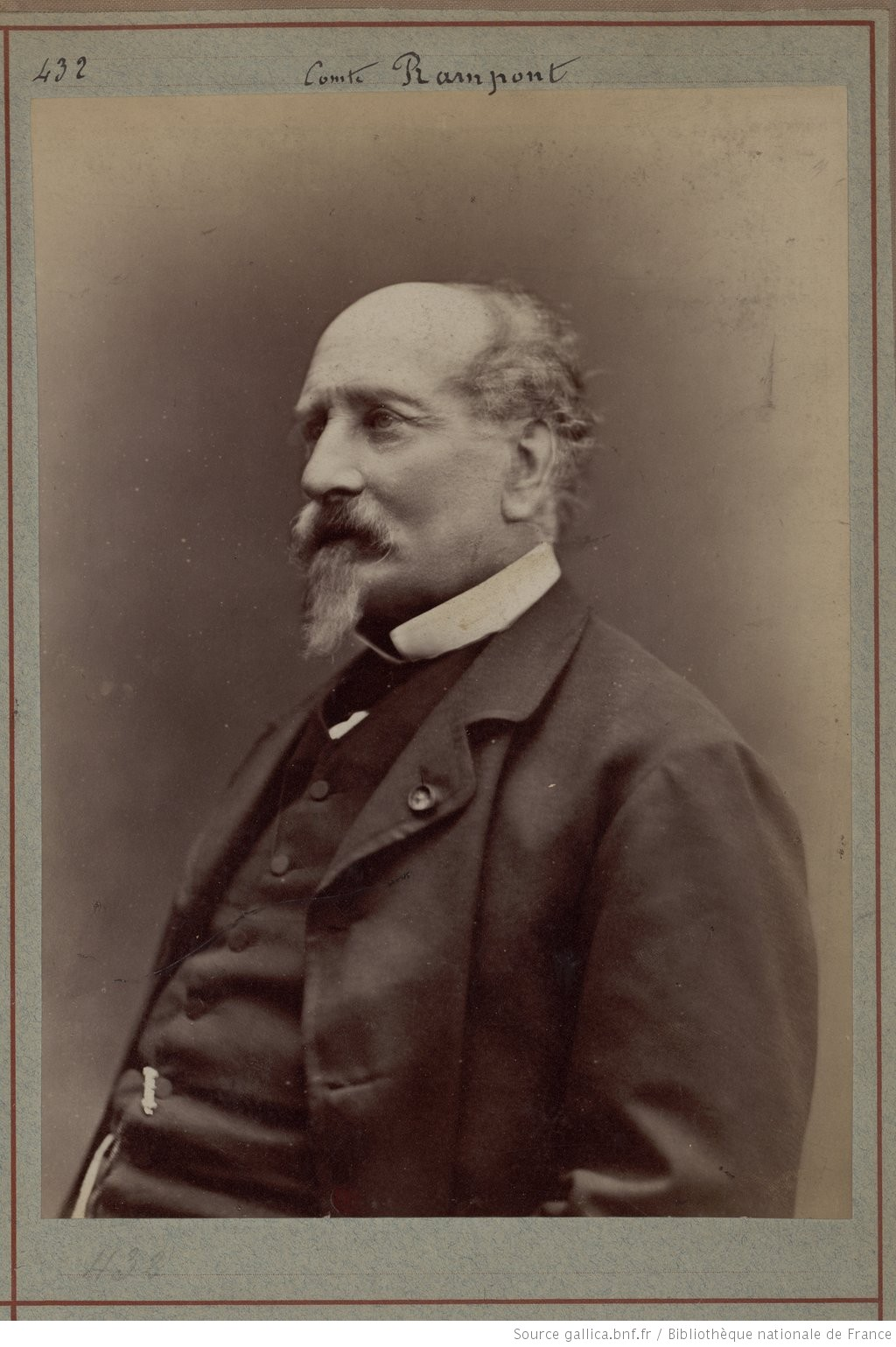

Deputy of Ardèche
- In office 18 December 1837 – 12 June 1842

Representative of Ardèche
- In office 8 February 1871 – 7 March 1876

Senator of Ardèche
- In office 30 January 1876 – 11 January 1883
- Succeeded by: Arthur Chalamet

Personal details
- Born: 9 July 1805 Paris, France
- Died: 11 January 1883 (aged 77) Paris, France
- Occupation: Soldier, politician

Count Joachim Achille Rampon (9 July 1805 – 11 January 1883) was a French soldier, aristocrat, and politician who was deputy for the department of Ardèche from 1837 to 1842, and again from 1871 to 1876, and was Senator of Ardèche from 1876 until his death.

== Early years (1805–37) ==
Joachim Achille Rampon was born in Paris on 9 July 1805.His parents were the Count Antoine-Guillaume Rampon (1759–1842), a general, and Louise Elisabeth Riffard de Saint Martin. He studied at the Collège Henri IV, then at the École spéciale militaire de Saint-Cyr. He entered Saint-Cyr on 1 November 1822, then went to the Saumur Cavalry School, which he left as 2nd lieutenant on 1 October 1824. Due to illness, he obtained a long leave without pay.

In 1827 he became a 2nd lieutenant of the 8th Chasseurs.He was promoted to lieutenant in 1830. He resigned from the chasseurs and became aide-de-camp of Gilbert du Motier, Marquis de Lafayette, in 1830. He was then appointed staff colonel of the National Guard of the Seine, then General and Deputy Chief of Staff.In 1831, he married Emilie Marguerite de la Borne (born 1811). He was made an Officer of the Legion of Honour on 10 June 1837.

== July Monarchy (1837–48) ==
During the July Monarchy Rampon was a member of the Chamber of Deputies representing Ardèche from 18 December 1837 to 2 February 1839. (Note: The National Assembly website says Rampon was elected to the Chamber of Deputies for a first term on 18 December 1837, then reelected on 2 March 1839. Another source says he was elected deputy for Tournon (Ardèche) in 1836. The official history and other sources imply he was first elected in 1839.) He sat with the constitutional opposition.He was reelected on 2 March 1839, and held office until 12 June 1842.Rampon was elected Deputy for the 1st College of Ardéche (Privas) on 2 March 1839, by 156 out of 305 votes cast. He again sat with the opposition. He voted against the endowment of the Duc de Nemours and for the fortifications of Paris. In the election of 9 July 1842, he won 119 votes against 205 for Jean-André-Hippolyte Champanhet^{(fr)}, who was elected. As sole heir, he was invested with the majorat of Baron by royal decree on 31 May 1845.

== Second Republic and Second Empire (1848–70) ==
After the February 1848 Revolution Rampon did not participate in politics during the French Second Republic.Rampon did not support the Second French Empire.In 1867, he was elected to the Ardéche General Council representing Tournon. On 24 May 1869, he ran for office for the 3rd constituency of Ardéche but was defeated.

== Third Republic (1870–83) ==
After the fall of the Second Empire, on 30 November 1870, Rampon was appointed Colonel of the 3rd Legion of Mobilisés of the Ardèche. During the Franco-Prussian War (1870–71), he participated in the operations of the Army of the East and distinguished himself in several engagements.

On 8 February 1871, Rampon was elected Representative of Ardèche in the National Assembly by 44,709 votes out of 73,015. He was president of the Centre gauche parliamentary group. He supported the policy of Adolphe Thiers, voted for the peace treaty, for abrogation of the laws of exile, for three years of military service, against the resignation of Thiers, against the Septennat, against the ministry of Albert de Broglie, for the constitutional laws, and against the law on higher education.In June 1873, he protested against the famous Pascal circular.

Rampon was re-elected to the General Council of Ardèche for the canton of Tournon on 8 October 1871, and appointed president of the council.At his initiative, in 1871, the General Council agreed to erect a monument to those from Ardèche who had died in the war of 1870–71. The statue was erected in 1879.He was Mayor of Gilhoc-sur-Ormèze from 1873 to 1883.He was reelected to the Ardèche General council for Tournon in 1874. He was reelected president of the general council after an interval in August 1876.

Rampon was elected senator of the Ardèche on 30 January 1876 by 210 votes out of 403. He sat with the center left and became vice-president of the Senate. n 23 June 1877, he voted against the dissolution of the House demanded by the de Broglie Ministry.He held office until his death in Paris on 11 January 1883. He was replaced in the Senate on 1 April 1883, by Arthur Chalamet.

== Sources ==
- Albums (in French), Archives of Ardèche
- Bitard, Adolphe Louis Émile (1880), "RAMPON (COMTE), JOACHIM ACHILLE", Dictionnaire de biographie contemporaine, française et étrangère ... augm. d'un supplément comprenant les additions et changements divers survenus pendant l'impression (in French), L. Vanier
- Garric, Alain, "Joachim Achille Rampon", Geneanet
- Joachim, Achille Rampon (in French), Assemblée nationale
- Mialan, "Général Rampon", Raconte moi de l’Ardèche (in French)
- Robert, Adolphe; Cougny, Gaston (1889–1891), "RAMPON (JOACHIM-ACHILLE, COMTE)", in Edgar Bourloton (ed.), Dictionnaire des Parlementaires français (1789–1889) (in French)
