= Forge (video game) =

2012 video game

- Developer(s): Dark Vale Games
- Engine: Unreal Engine 3
- Platform(s): Microsoft Windows
- Release: Dec. 4, 2012
- Mode(s): Multiplayer

Forge was a third-person massively multiplayer online combat game developed and released by Dark Vale Games on December 4, 2012. The game received mixed reviews that praised its uniqueness in its gameplay, and criticized a lack of imagination in its visual presentation. It was developed as a way to play end-game MMORPG player versus player combat, without the hours of work to get there.

The game has now been removed from Steam. Those who purchased it when it was available will have it remain in their Steam library, but because the online service is no longer running, it is unplayable.

== Gameplay ==
Forge is a fast-paced, third-person combat game, styled after the player versus player combat found in MMORPGs. There are a number of different classes to choose from. The combat consists of two teams, pitted against each other in various arenas, competing in a selection of game modes. Each player has 9 different abilities to use. These abilities have a cooldown, ranging from less than a second, to over a minute. Players can use these abilities to damage and hinder their enemies by slowing or blinding them, or help their allies by healing them or giving them a movement boost. The game features a heavy emphasis on vertical movement, which includes a wall jump mechanic.

== Development ==
The game was originally released at a price, but was later changed to be free to play, due to a lack of players.

== Reception ==
Forge has been praised by critics for capturing the map style and player versus player combat from games such as Guild Wars 2 and World of Warcraft, but set in small arena-style zones. It features the typical fantasy class types such as mages, assassins, archers, and warriors. Critics enjoyed that the game avoided an auto-targeting system like other MMORPGs. Auto-targeting systems tend to earn criticism in such other games. The game has been criticized for not having enough interesting content, and for having poor visual design. Map design has been well received.
