= Saint-Fortunat-sur-Eyrieux =

- Commune
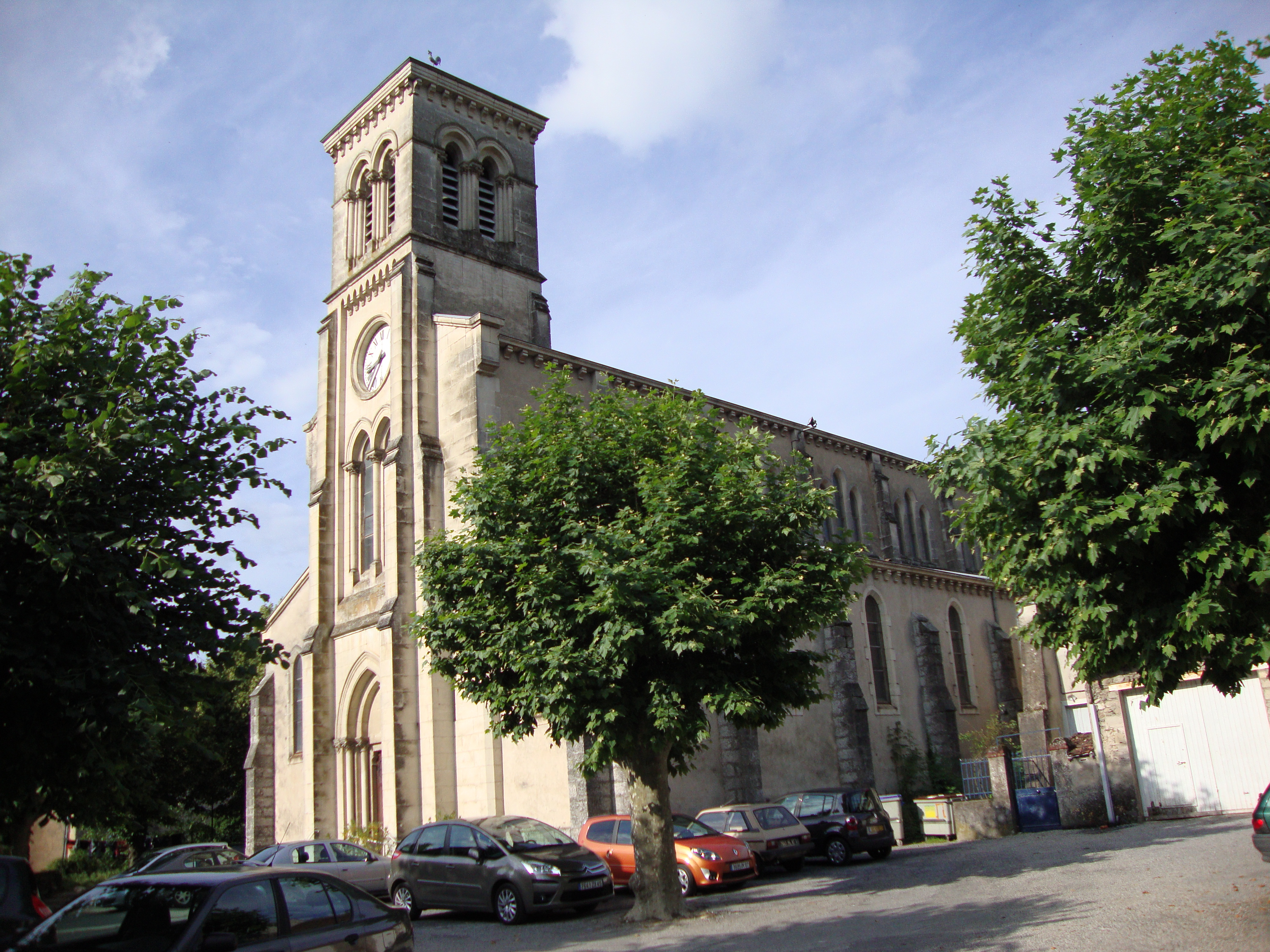
- The church in Saint-Fortunat-sur-Eyrieux
- Location of Saint-Fortunat-sur-Eyrieux
- Location within France Location within Auvergne-Rhône-Alpes
- Coordinates: 44°49′48″N 4°40′35″E
- Country: France
- Region: Auvergne-Rhône-Alpes
- Department: Ardèche
- Arrondissement: Privas
- Canton: Rhône-Eyrieux
- Intercommunality: CA Privas Centre Ardèche

Government
  - Mayor (2020–2026): Christian Feroussier
- Area^{1}: 22.07 km^{2} (8.52 sq mi)
- Elevation: 148 m (486 ft)
- Highest elevation: 791 m (2,595 ft)
- Lowest elevation: 115 m (377 ft)
- Population (2023): 817
  - Density: 37.0/km^{2} (95.9/sq mi)
- Time zone: UTC+01:00 (CET)
  - Summer (DST): UTC+02:00 (CEST)
- INSEE/Postal code: 07237 /07360
- ^{1} French Land Register data, which excludes lakes, ponds, glaciers > 1 km^{2} (0.386 sq mi or 247 acres) and river estuaries.

Saint-Fortunat-sur-Eyrieux (French pronunciation: [sɛ̃ fɔʁtyna syʁ eʁjø]; Vivaro-Alpine: Sant Fortunat) is a commune in the Ardèche department in southern France.

== Population ==
Historical population
| Year | Pop. | ±% p.a. |
|---|---|---|
| 1968 | 728 | — |
| 1975 | 633 | −1.98% |
| 1982 | 543 | −2.17% |
| 1990 | 531 | −0.28% |
| 1999 | 542 | +0.23% |
| 2007 | 692 | +3.10% |
| 2012 | 733 | +1.16% |
| 2017 | 775 | +1.12% |
| 2023 | 817 | +0.88% |
Source: INSEE

== See also ==
- Communes of the Ardèche department
