= Forgy, Ohio =

Unincorporated community in Ohio, U.S.

Coordinates: 39°54′47″N 83°59′30″W

Forgy is an unincorporated community in Clark County, in the U.S. state of Ohio.

== History ==
A post office was established at Forgy in 1883, and remained in operation until 1923. The community has the name of C. S. Forgy, a railroad official.
