= The Forge (Goya) =

Painting by Francisco de Goya

- La fragua (Spanish)
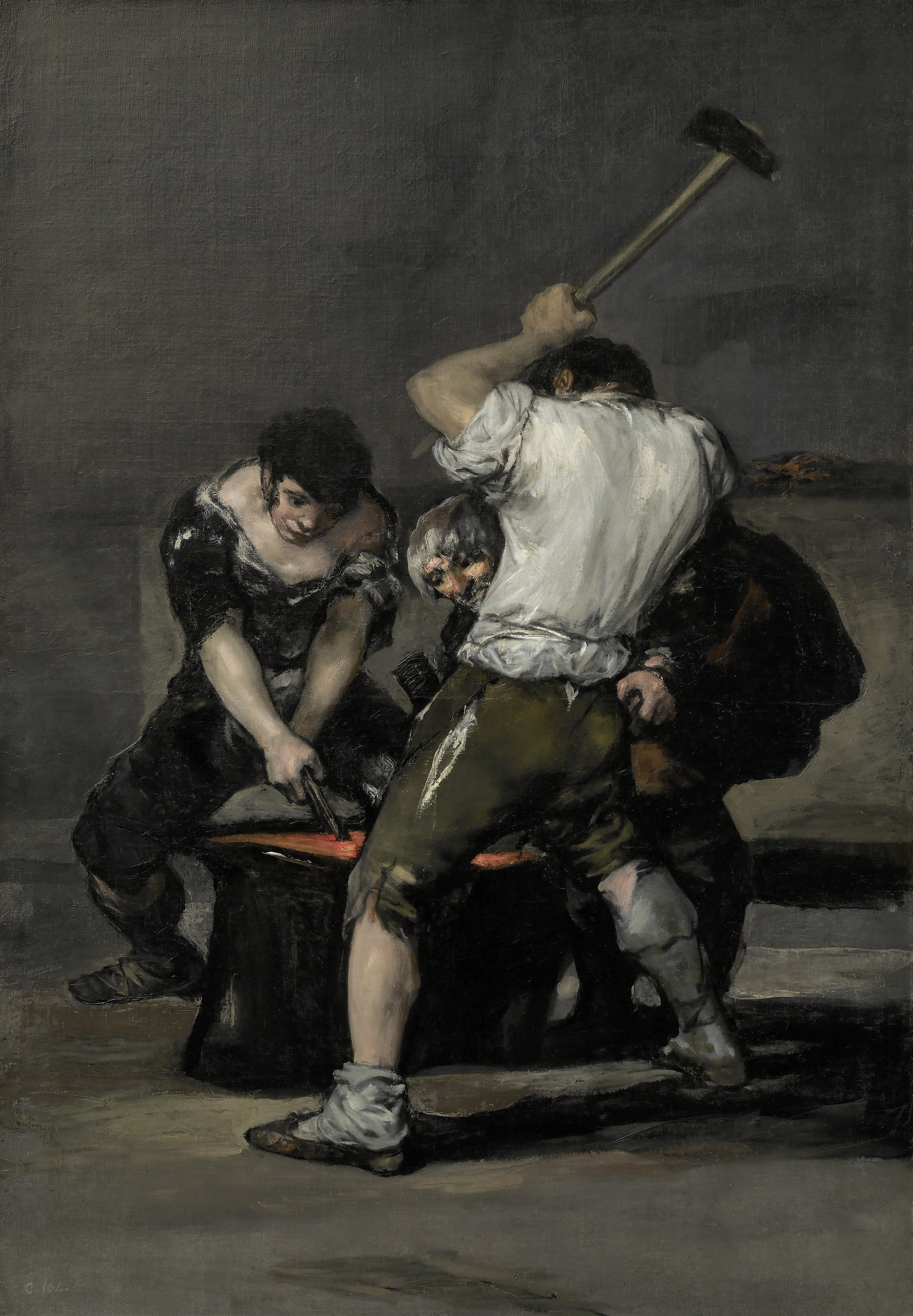
- Artist: Francisco Goya
- Year: c. 1817
- Medium: Oil on canvas
- Dimensions: 181.6 cm × 125 cm (71 1/2 in × 49 1/4 in)
- Location: Frick Collection, New York

The Forge (Spanish: La fragua) is a c. 1817 painting by Francisco Goya (1746–1828), today housed in the Frick Collection in New York City. The large oil on canvas represents three blacksmiths toiling over an anvil, and has been described by the art historian Fred Licht as "undoubtedly the most complete statement of Goya's late style."

== Description and meaning ==
Devoid of narrative, the painting is an almost photographic capture of a single moment. Set in an ambiguous space, it forms a study in grays, blues and black, punctuated by the blazing red of heated metal. The composition is balanced by the complementary gestures of the figures.

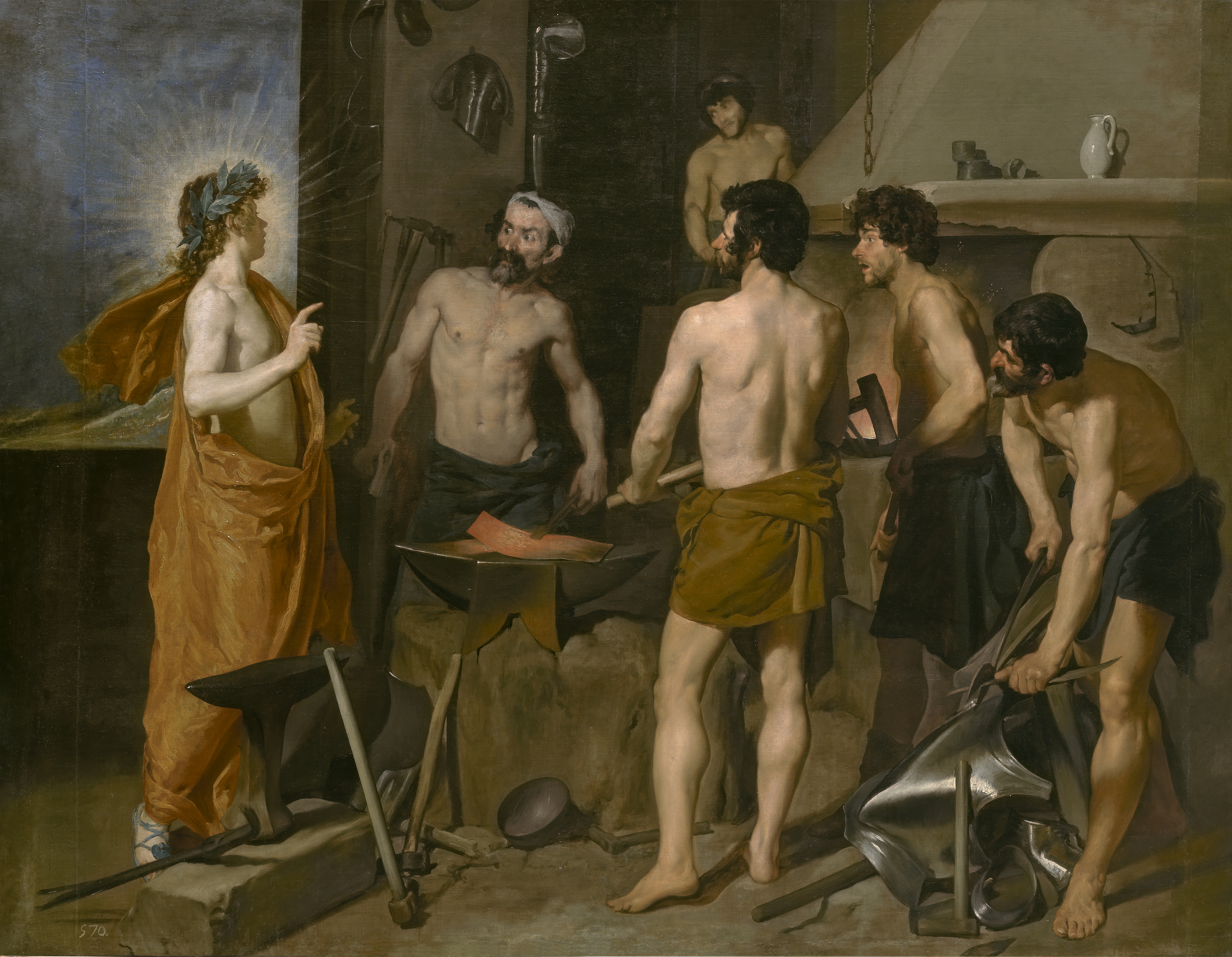
Apollo in the Forge of Vulcan by Diego Velázquez, (1630).

The Forge emphasises the muscularity of the men, who are rendered as classically heroic with thick, strong arms and heavy masculine backs. Yet their faces indicate a coarseness of temperament—a device likely used to make them more identifiable to the common man. The figures are likely intended to represent the working class of the 19th-century Spain—hammering out the future of the country in a literal allegory to the then-popular saying "on the anvil of history". In this way, the work evokes the imagery of resistance to the French threat from Napoleon, earlier examined by Goya in his 1808 painting The Knifegrinder, and may refer to the peoples' participation in drafting the Constitution. Though a court painter, Goya was sensitive throughout his life to the plight of common men. He often captured their everyday lives, usually emphasising the dignity of work or the suffering of war.

Other meanings have been suggested. Art historian Janis Tomlinson notes that the presence of the old man in the painting may be a reference to the Forge of Vulcan, a classical story in which the god was deceived by his young wife; if so, The Forge may also be thematically related to two other paintings by Goya that are the same dimensions: The Young Ones (Les Jeunes) and Time (Les Vielles), each of which illustrate female inconstancy. Though seeing "no hint of a classical source", art historian Michael Fried has interpreted sexual implications in "the strong pelvic thrust of the near worker depicted from behind in combination with the fierce concentration of all the workers on the red hot iron."

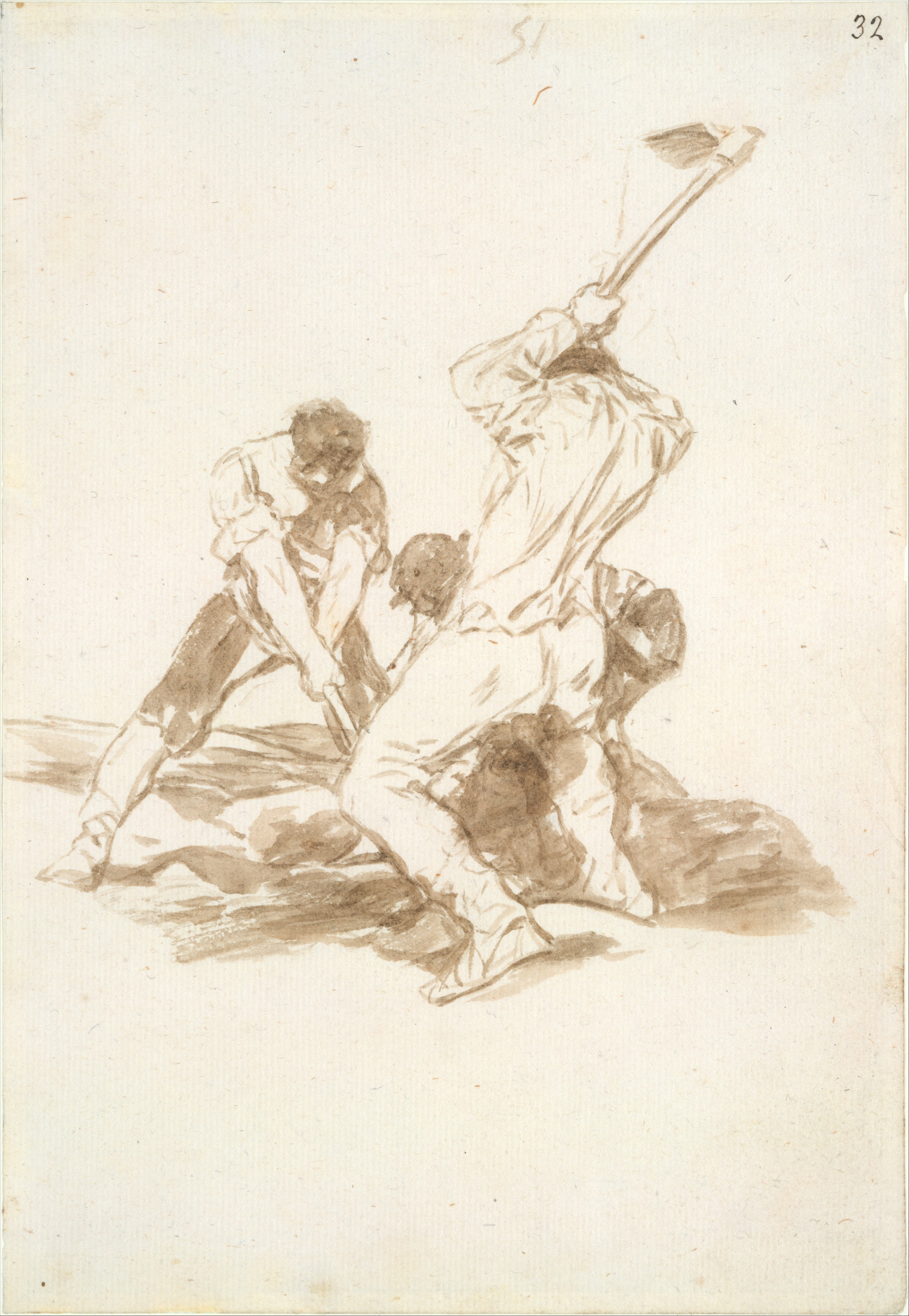
Three Men Digging, c. 1817. Sepia wash, 206 × 143 mm. Metropolitan Museum of Art, New York

The work appears to be related to his drawing Three Men Digging, which may have been made as a preparatory study, and notwithstanding the uncertainty in dating both works, it is supposed that both were done between 1815 and 1820 because of stylistic affinities to the Black Paintings. Despite similarities between the figures' positions in the drawing and the painting, there are several differences. The viewpoint in The Forge is lower, and makes the figures appear more imposing; unlike the drawing, two of the men's faces are visible; and the action in the drawing involves the digging of a hole with farm tools, while that of the painting is focused on an anvil. Both images may be seen as abstracted rather than realistic visions, as they each lack anecdotal context, and place three men in an impractical proximity.

== Provenance ==
As with many of Goya's portraits of ordinary Spanish people, the work was not commissioned and not published or sold during his lifetime. Upon his death, its ownership passed to his son, and it was later acquired by King Louis-Philippe for his Spanish gallery of the Louvre, where it was exhibited from 1838 until 1851, when it was sent to England. In 1853 it was sold at Christie's in London, and was eventually bought from Knoedler in 1914 for the Frick Collection.

== See also ==
- List of works by Francisco Goya
