= FORGE Program =

United States-based nonprofit organization

FORGE is a United States-based nonprofit organization that works with displaced communities in Africa. FORGE was founded by Stanford University graduate Kjerstin Erickson at the age of 20 in 2003. Since its founding, FORGE has implemented over seventy community development projects that have served more than 70,000 refugees in four refugee camps in Zambia and Botswana. An official Operating Partner of the United Nations refugee agency (UNHCR), FORGE works in Zambia, hand-in-hand with refugees from the Democratic Republic of Congo, Angola, Rwanda, Burundi, and Sudan.

== FORGE’s Mission ==
FORGE aims to build upon the capacity of African refugees to cultivate empowered communities and to create the conditions for peace and prosperity in their countries. FORGE believes that individuals affected by war are a key factor in breaking the cycle of war and poverty in Africa. Instead of providing relief work for refugees, FORGE aims at providing education and training to refugees in order to empower them with greater economic and leadership capacity. There are five main project areas that FORGE is now working on: Education, Economic Development, Health Education, Women's Empowerment and Community Enrichment.

Recently, FORGE has launched a new program called the Collaborative Project Planning Process (CPPP). Believing that the most effective, relevant and sustainable development projects come from the insights and vision of the refugee community itself, FORGE launched the CPPP to provide refugees with the resources that are unreachable to them when building education and enrichment projects for their communities.

== Collaborative Project Planning Process (CPPP) ==
The collaborative project is a partnership built between FORGE and refugee leaders in the refugee camps where FORGE currently works. The planning of the project involves the following four stages.

- Stage I - Identification of needs: The refugee community identifies its top needs and priorities.
- Stage II – Assessment of needs: Selected community leaders research and evaluate these needs.
- Stage III – Project proposal: The best intervention point is selected and leaders submit a Project Proposal to FORGE's website for funding.
- Stage IV – Funding and implementation: Once funded, the project is implemented, monitored and sustained by the community.

To begin the CPPP, FORGE first recruits potential refugee leaders who are especially capable of spearheading development initiatives in the refugee camps. The CPPP then goes through the Stages I, II and III. The preparation work is all done by the refugee leaders and the role of the FORGE staff member is to give advice to the refugee leaders when necessary. After all four stages of the CPPP are complete, the projects designed by the refugee leaders will begin and they are to run the projects for at least a year. The funding for new projects is coordinated by FORGE headquarters in the United States and is managed by a FORGE field staff member who serves as a facilitator and an adviser of the refugee leaders as well as a bridge of communication between the refugee camps and the US office.

Fundraising for new projects is basically the responsibility of the US office, although most international staff based in Zambia, including project managers, are required to raise a minimum of $5,000 to offset the costs of their monthly stipends. The fundraising for the Collaborative Projects happen between stage 2 and stage 3. There are currently three projects underway in this collaborative approach. They are the Block H Reliable Seed & Market Program, Mwangaza Education Centers and FORGE Health Service. These projects are now going through stage two and heading towards stage three.

== FORGE’s Development and Future ==
Since its establishment, FORGE has worked in four refugee camps in Botswana and Zambia in central Africa. As the refugee camp in Botswana was beginning to decrease in size and the refugees were repatriating, FORGE started to retreat from the area and focus its work in Zambia where a large number of refugees have come from the countries surrounding Zambia due to civil wars.

FORGE has been working closely with the refugees in three refugee camps in Zambia: Meheba, Kala and Mwange. As peace was proclaimed in the Democratic Republic of the Congo, the Congolese refugees in Kala and Mwange camps were beginning to repatriate under UNHCR's assistance. In light of this, FORGE is now planning to expand its work to the Congo in the coming years. FORGE aims to continue to support and help the former refugees to rebuild their lives in their home country of Congo by providing education, training and counseling until the people genuinely feel safe living in their homeland and have confidence to rebuild their communities on their own. As of December 2009, FORGE no longer operates in Kala and Mwange refugee camps.

== See also ==
- Refugee
- Great Lakes refugee crisis
