= Forgery (disambiguation) =

Forgery is the process of making false documents.

Forgery may also refer to the following conceptually similar topics:

- Art forgery
- Digital signature forgery

== See also ==
- Counterfeit
