= Battle of Alexandria (1801) =

Battle of the French invasion of Egypt and Syria

- Part of the French invasion of Egypt and Syria
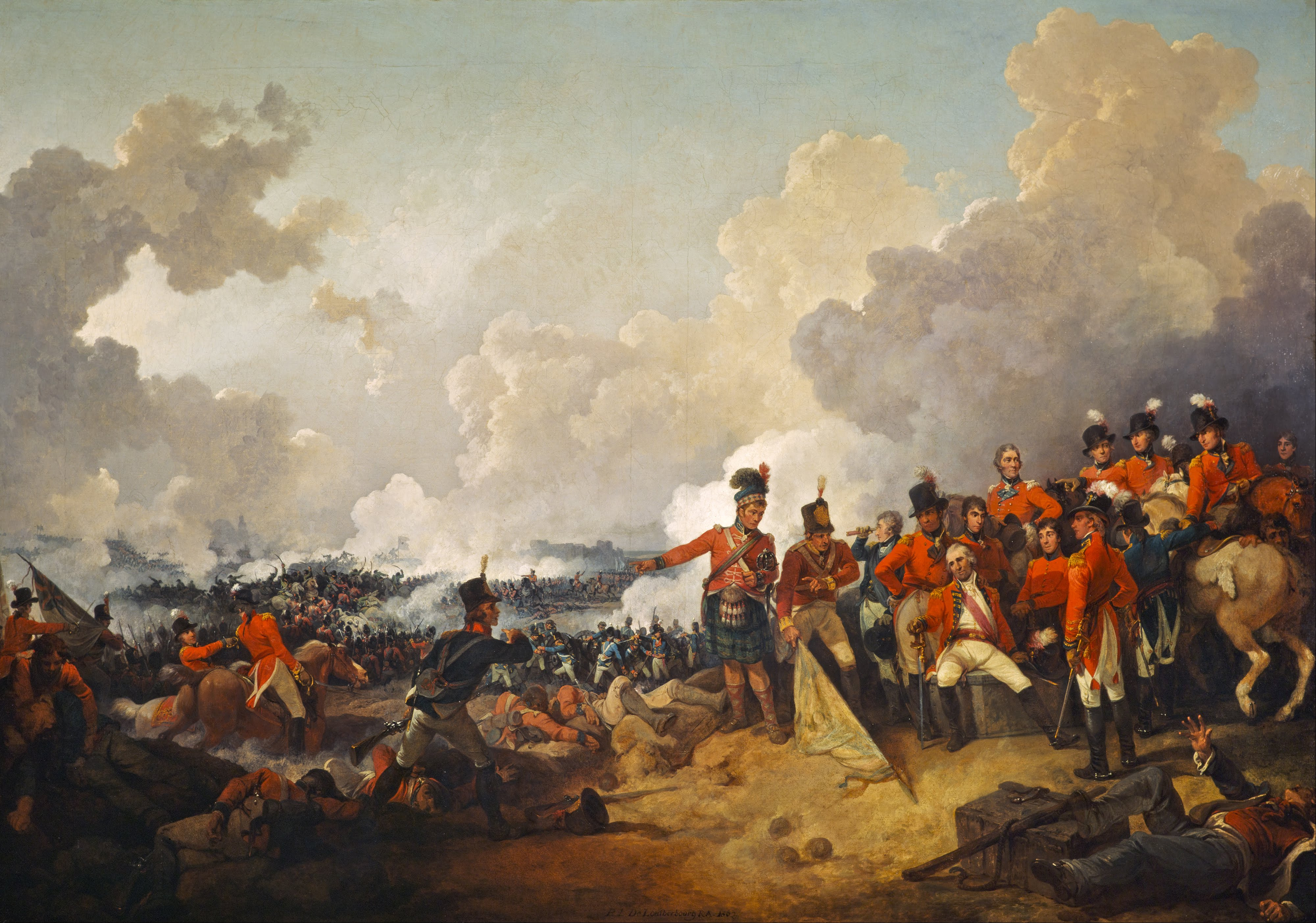
- The Battle of Alexandria (1802)
Date	21 March 1801
Location	Near Alexandria, Ottoman Egypt 31.22°N 29.95°E
Result	British victory

Belligerents
United Kingdom	France

Commanders and leaders
Ralph Abercromby (DOW); John Hely-Hutchinson; John Moore (WIA); Eyre Coote; John Doyle; John Stuart; Sidney Smith; Frederick Maitland	Jacques-François Menou; François Lanusse †; Jean Reynier; Antoine Rampon; César Antoine Roize †

Strength
12,000 (Note: 10,300 only foot and horse)–14,200 35 cannon Several gunboats 1 naval cannon onshore	10,000 (Note: 20,000 total engaged. Another source states that Menou gathered only 10,000 men for battle.)–16,000 (Note: From 12,000 to 14,000 "in the field."); 46 cannon

Casualties and losses
243 killed 1,253 wounded 32 missing	1,700–5,000 killed, wounded, captured or missing
- Location within Mediterranean

The Battle of Alexandria (also known as the Battle of Canope/Canopus) was fought on 21 March 1801, where the British army and naval forces repelled an assault by the French army as part of the French invasion of Egypt and Syria. Led by General Sir Ralph Abercromby, the British entrenched army engaged a French force under Divisional-general Jacques-François Menou near the ruins of Nicopolis, on the narrow spit of land between the Mediterranean Sea and Abukir. The British routed Menou's army after several hours of fierce fighting, though Abercromby was mortally wounded. Part of the French casualties at Alexandria was caused by British naval force under Frederick Maitland, whose role was also important in suppressing the French attacks. John Hely-Hutchinson, who replaced Abercromby, led the British army to Alexandria and laid siege to the city, which surrendered in September.

== Background ==
Following Lanusse's defeat at Mandora, Menou finally arrived from Cairo to take direct command of French forces, and determined to attack on 21 March. François Lanusse would lead on the left with the brigades of Valentin and Silly, supported by the infantry Divisions of Antoine-Guillaume Rampon in the centre and Jean Reynier on the right.

The British position on the night of 20 March extended across the isthmus, the right wing resting upon the ruins of Nicopolis and the sea, the left on the lake of Abukir and the Alexandria canal. The line faced generally south-west towards the city, the reserve division under Major-General Sir John Moore on the right, the Foot Guards brigade under George Ludlow in the centre, and three other brigades on the left under Eyre Coote, John Cradock and Earl Cavan. In the second line were two infantry brigades and the cavalry (dismounted).

== Battle ==
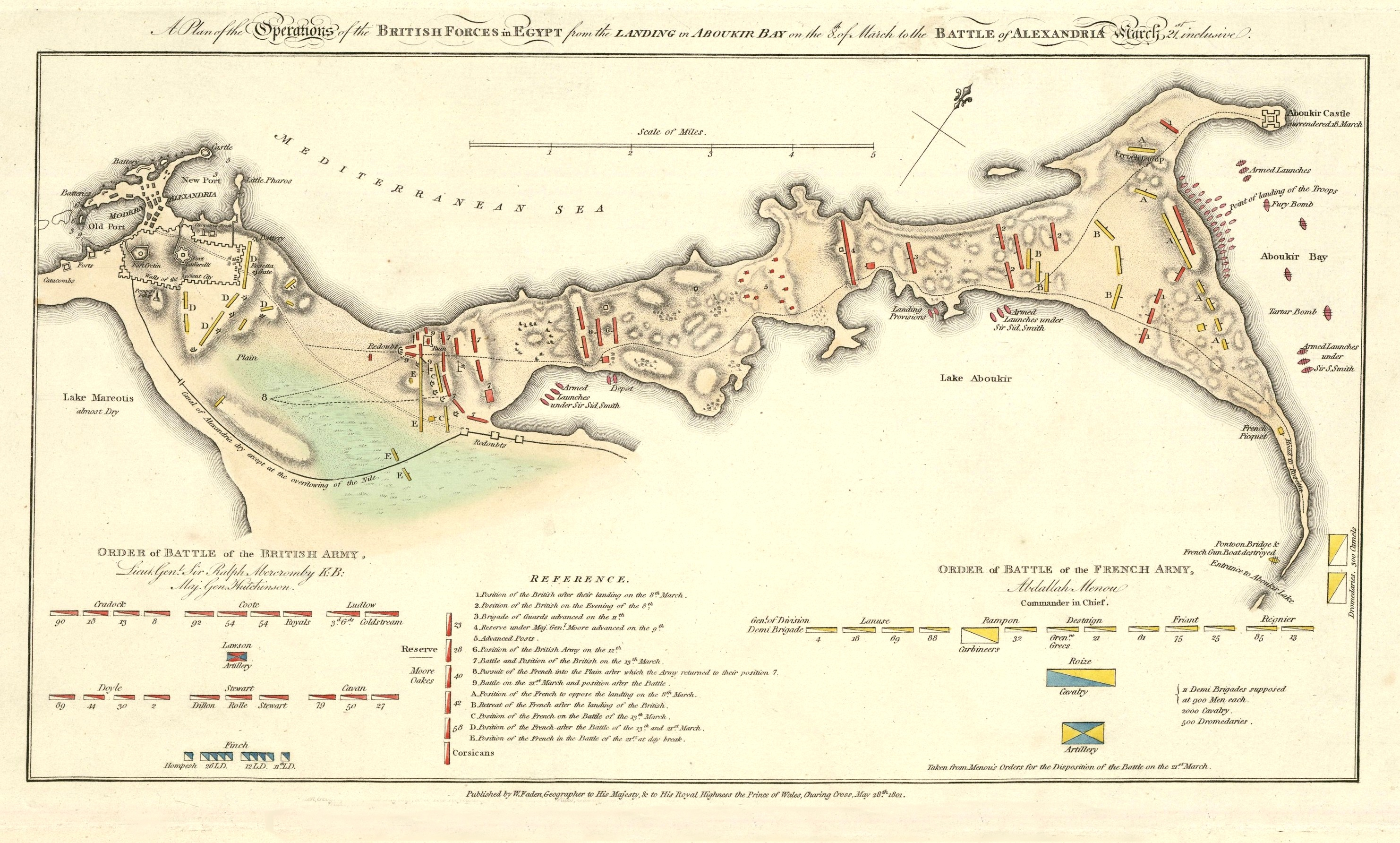
Map of the British plan for the battle

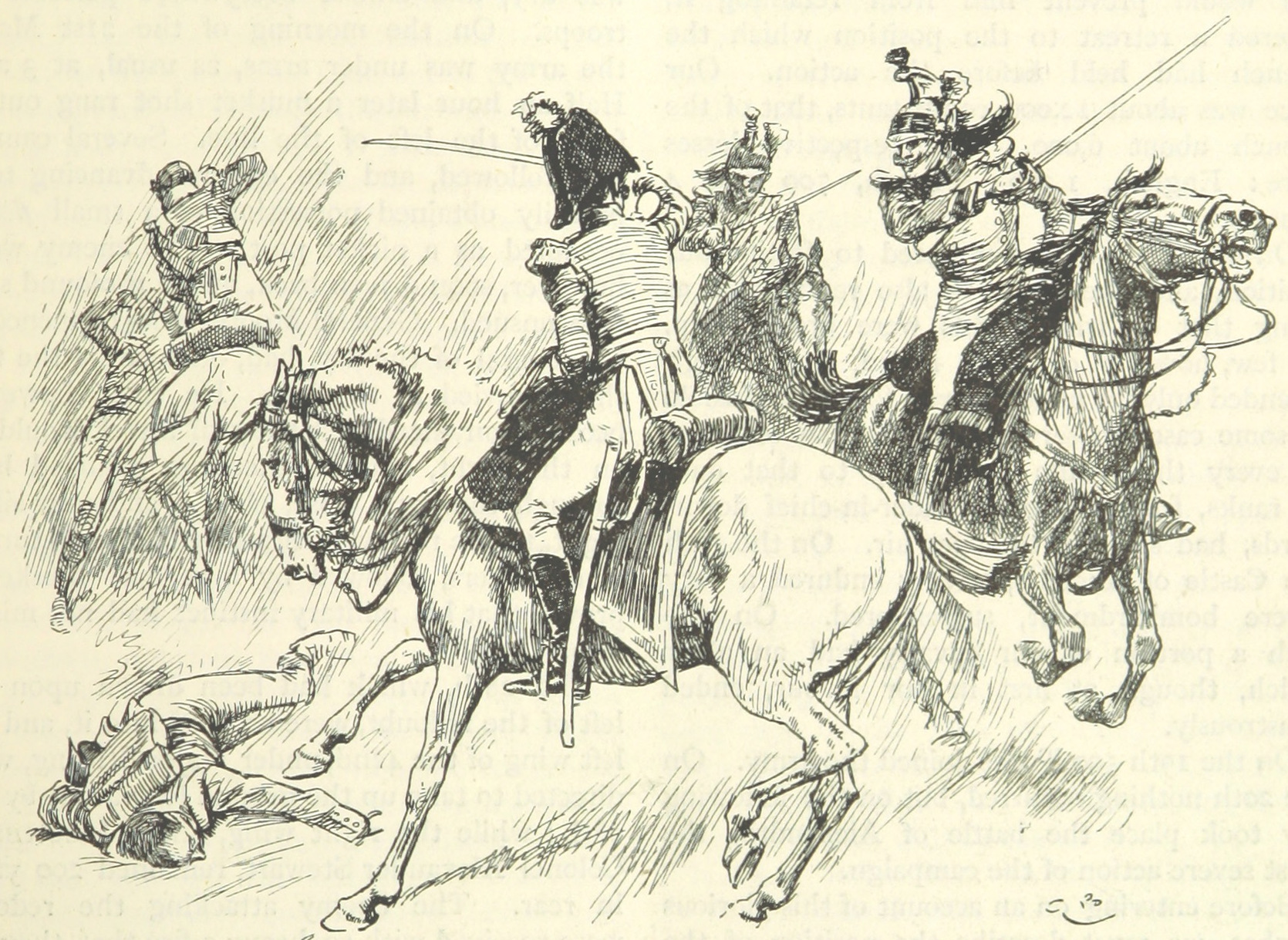
Abercromby (centre) fighting two French dragoons

Abercromby anticipated a night attack, so on 21 March, the British slept in position under arms. At 3:30 a.m., the French attacked and drove the British outposts. Moving forward rapidly with great gallantry from the left, Lanusse launched the attack with Valentin's brigade in column along the seashore, and to their right Silly's brigade against the British entrenchments around the Roman ruins. The brunt of the attack fell upon Moore's command, and in particular upon the 28th (North Gloucestershire) Regiment of Foot. The British repulsed this first assault, during which both Silly and Lanusse were hit. "General Lanusse saw that General Valentin had left the seashore, and was within the re-entering angle of the redoubt and the Roman camp, where the cross fire of the enemy held him back. General Lanusse marched to this spot, encouraged the men, and made them advance. The worthy general was hit in the thigh by a ball from a gunboat; four grenadiers tried to carry him off, but a second ball killed two of these brave fellows".

Soon Rampon's command in the centre was engaged, and despite disorientation in the dark, penetrated between the front and rear wings of the 42nd Regiment of Foot. A confused fight ensued in the ruins, in which the French troops were all either killed or captured, with the 42nd taking their colour. Other British regiments engaged were the 23rd Regiment of Foot, 40th (the 2nd Somersetshire) Regiment of Foot and 58th (Rutlandshire) Regiment of Foot, together with Stuart's Minorca Regiment.

During this time, Menou had devolved command to his subordinates, and was seen gesticulating wildly at the rear "more as if he were a spectator than the commander in chief". However he now ordered his reserve cavalry forward in an unsupported charge. The commander, Cézar Antoine Roize remonstrated in vain; the Republican cavalry nevertheless was able to penetrate as far as the British camp and Abercromby's headquarters, inflicting severe losses on the 42nd Foot before a combination of dug fortifications and musketry ended this effort.

"Turning to his brave men, General Roize says, 'Friends, they are sending us to glory and death! March!' The charge was terrible... Brave General Roize, seeing his first line driven back, advanced with the second, made a desperate charge, and penetrated to the camp of the second English line, sabring and overthrowing all in his road. The terrified English threw themselves on their faces on the ground; others fled to their tents; but this obstacle stopped the terrible rush of our cavalry and caused our ruin. The English had dug wolf-pits in their camp, and strewn caltrops about, plentifully. The horses fell into these pits, or were entangled amongst the cords and tent pegs. The brave and unfortunate General Roize, finding there was no chance of escaping from such a position, dismounted, fought like a lion, and was killed, as were also his men."

The front and rear ranks of the 28th Foot were simultaneously engaged on both their front and rear, the soldiers receiving the order "Front rank stay as you are, rear rank about turn". In commemoration, the regiment later adopted a second cap badge, the 'Back Number,' worn at the back of their head-dress. During the attack of Roize's second line, Sir Ralph Abercromby was briefly captured by French dragoons, but was quickly rescued by a highlander of the 42nd. About this time, he received a bullet wound to the thigh which would eventually prove fatal, though he remained on the field and in command to the end. Rampon's renewed infantry attack on the centre was repulsed by the Guards brigade, supported by Coote's brigade, and the left wing maintained its position with ease, but the French cavalry for the second time, came to close quarters with the reserve.

About half-past eight, the combat began to wane, and the last shots were fired at ten. Most of the attacks had been pressed home on the British right. The History of the Queen's Royal West Surrey Regiment praises the regiment's reserve, saying that "the determined attack would have been successful against almost any other troops." Technically, the details of the action show that, while not markedly better in a melee than the war-seasoned French, the British infantry had in its volleys a power that no other troops then existing possessed, and it was these volleys that decided the day even more than the individual stubbornness of the men.

The 42nd, twice charged by cavalry, had but 13 men wounded by the sabre. Part of the French losses were caused by the gunboats which lay close inshore and cannonaded the left flank of the French columns, and by a heavy naval gun which was placed in battery near the position of the 28th Foot.

== Aftermath ==
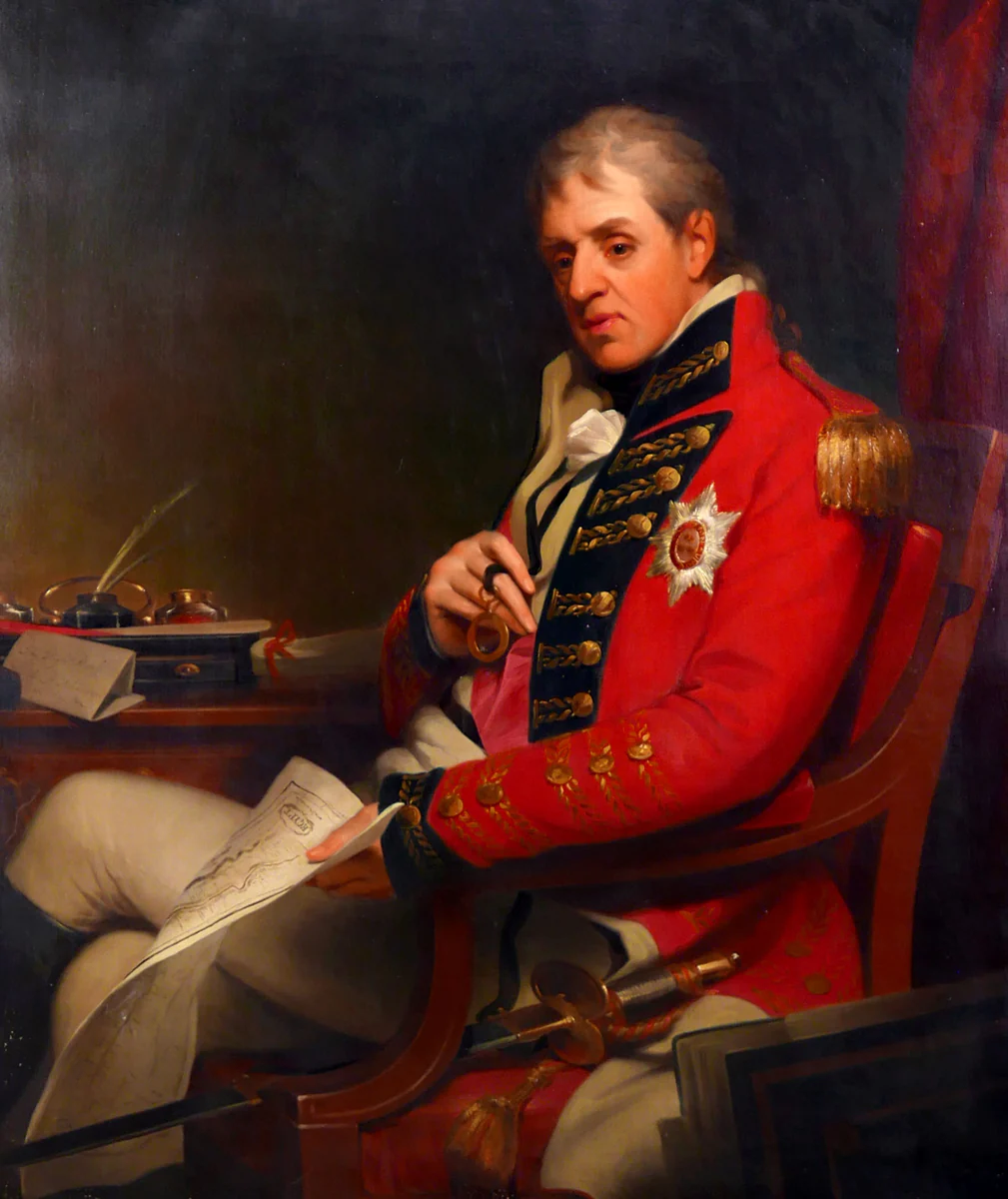
John Hely-Hutchinson, who replaced Abercromby as commander of the British army in Egypt

The armies engaged on this day both numbered approximately 14,000 men. Losses for the British were 10 officers and 233 other ranks killed, 60 officers and 1,193 other ranks wounded, and 3 officers and 29 other ranks missing. Amongst the senior officers, the dead included Abercromby (who succumbed to his wound on 28 March), Lt Col David Ogilvy of the 44th Foot and Lt Col Dutens of the Minorca regt. Moore, Oakes, and the Adjutant General John Hope were wounded. The French suffered 1,000 dead, 600 wounded and 200 prisoners, though Fortescue considers up to 4,000 overall. Amongst the French casualties were three generals killed (Lanusse, Roize and brigade commander Baudot in Reynier's Division) and several other senior officers wounded. Additionally, the flag of the 21st Light demi-brigade and one Austrian cannon were lost.

John Hely-Hutchinson replaced Abercromby in command of British forces, which then advanced upon Alexandria to lay siege to it. The French garrison surrendered on 2 September 1801. Reynier heavily criticised Menou in his mémoires on his return to France – Bonaparte ordered the mémoires suppressed in 1802 for this reason (and possibly others). In their defence, Menou, Rampon and Lagrange, however, all blamed Reynier, Damas and Lanusse for the defeat.
