= Battle of Mandora =

1801 battle of the French invasion of Egypt and Syria

- Part of the French invasion of Egypt and Syria
- The 90th Foot engaging French troops during the battle
Date	13 March 1801
Location	Near Alexandria, Ottoman Egypt 31°16′30″N 30°00′45″E
Result	British victory

Belligerents
United Kingdom	France

Commanders and leaders
Ralph Abercromby; Sidney Smith	François Lanusse

Strength
13,000	7,000

Casualties and losses
185 killed; 1,136 wounded; 1 missing	700 killed or wounded
- Location within Mediterranean

The Battle of Mandora was fought on 13 March 1801 between 7,000 French troops under Divisional-general François Lanusse and 13,000 British troops under Lieutenant-general Sir Ralph Abercromby near Alexandria during the French invasion of Egypt and Syria. It was a failed attempt by the French to halt the British advance towards the French-held port of Alexandria.

== Background ==
In 1801 a British expeditionary force under Lieutenant-general Sir Ralph Abercromby was sent to Egypt to liberate it from French occupation following Napoleon's departure from the region in August 1799. On 1 March 1801 the army contingent of the expeditionary force, originally comprising 15,300 men but being greatly affected by disease, arrived at Aboukir Bay transported by 175 warships and troopships. On 8 March a British vanguard force of 5,500 men came ashore by boat at the bay, located 23 kilometres (14 miles) from the port city of Alexandria, and were opposed by 2,000 French troops from the garrison of Alexandria under Divisional-general Louis Friant drawn up on the sand dunes overlooking the landing beach. The ensuing battle was known as the Battle of Abukir, and the outcome had essentially been decided in the first 20 minutes of the landfall, when Major-general John Moore, commanding the centre of the British line, carried the main French position on a sand dune with a bayonet charge; the French were forced to retreat and the remaining British troops landed by nightfall.

Having established a depot and field hospital on the beach, the British besieged and captured Aboukir Castle from the French and began preparations to move against Alexandria. On 12 March, the British began their cautious advance towards Alexandria along a narrow isthmus between the Mediterranean and Lake Maadie (later known as Lake Aboukir). When they reached a feature called Mandora Tower, they made camp for the night.

In Cairo, French Divisional-general Jacques-François Menou was focused on the threat from Ottoman forces in the East, and initially downplayed the seriousness of the British landing, disregarding remonstrances of Divisional-general Jean Reynier and other French commanders, and sending just a small reinforcement to Alexandria under Divisional-general François Lanusse, a "fiery general", who, frustrated at the slow advance of the British, determined to attack.

== Battle ==
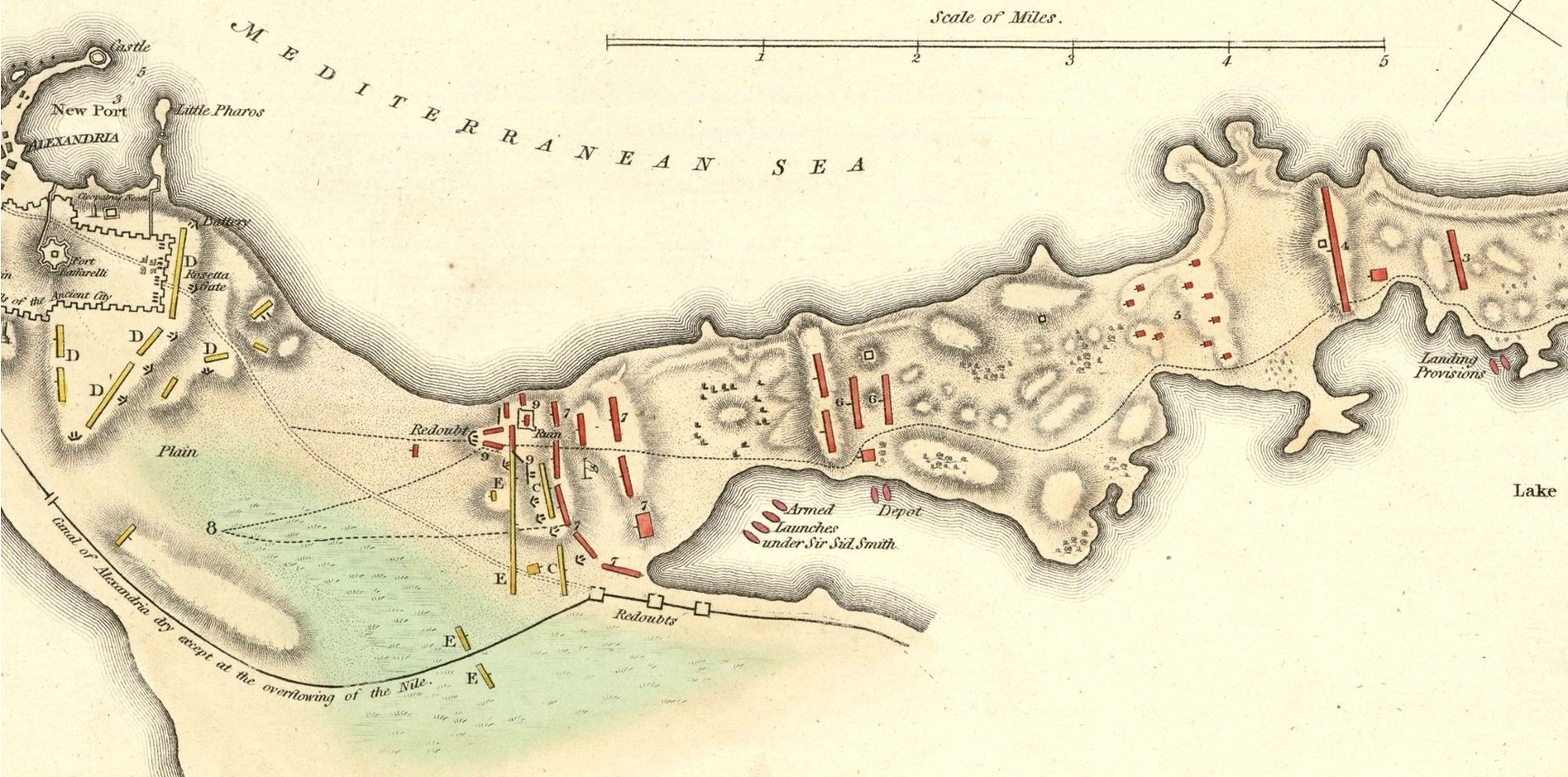
A detail of the Operations of the British Forces in Egypt in 1801 by William Faden. British positions on 12 March - "6". British attack on 13 March - "7". French defensive position - "C". Furthest advance of British - "8". Retired to "7" following French counterattack.

A personal reconnaissance by Abercromby had shown that a French force of nearly 5,000 men under Lanusse were holding a ridge of high ground which crossed the western end of the isthmus; their line rested on the ruins of Nicopolis of Alexandria at the north and the Alexandria Canal at the south, and had been strengthened by the construction of a redoubt. Accordingly, on March 13, the British began their advance at first light, in two lines. The French unleashed a fierce fire from their artillery and muskets on the 92nd Regiment of Foot which was leading the left column and mounted a cavalry charge against the 90th Regiment of Foot which was leading the right. Few of the French cavalry reached the British line, most being driven off by an effective volley of musket fire. The British gunboats, commanded by Captain Frederick Maitland and Captain James Hillyar, were also particularly useful in harassing the right flank of the French army. As the British lines continued their advance, the French began to withdraw to their fortifications on a further ridge just outside Alexandria; Dillon's Regiment (composed of various foreign troops and French émigré officers) captured two French guns by the canal in a bayonet charge.

Having secured the former French positions, Abercromby, who was determined to take the French fortifications outside Alexandria by a coup de main, began a further advance across the plain that separated the two ridges. Major-general John Hely-Hutchinson was ordered to take a hill overlooking the plain from the south which was successful, the 44th Regiment of Foot capturing a guarded bridge over the canal in the process. However, General Moore, commanding the right hand column, was met with intense artillery fire to which they were totally exposed. Halting while a reconnaissance was conducted by Abercromby, during which his horse was shot from underneath him, the British forces eventually withdrew at sunset to the line which they had captured earlier in the day.

== Aftermath ==
The British set about further fortifying their new position, landed heavy guns from the ships offshore and bringing up supplies with the intention of blockading the French garrison. It was in this position that a French counterattack would be defeated in the Battle of Alexandria on 21 March.

The British 90th and 92nd Regiments of Foot, who had borne the brunt of the fighting, were awarded the battle honour "Mandora".

The Mandora Barracks (built 1895, demolished 1970) at Aldershot in Hampshire were named after this action.
