= Old Forge =

Old Forge may refer to:

- Old Forge, Herefordshire, England, a hamlet in Goodrich parish
- Old Forge, New York, USA
- Old Forge, Franklin County, Pennsylvania, USA
- Old Forge, Lackawanna County, Pennsylvania, USA
- Old Forge, County Antrim, a townland in County Antrim, Northern Ireland
- The Old Forge pub, the remotest pub in mainland Great Britain, Inverie, Scotland

== See also ==
- Old Forge Farm, Hagerstown, Maryland, USA
