= Mustafa Pasha (Egypt) =

18th-century Ottoman military officer

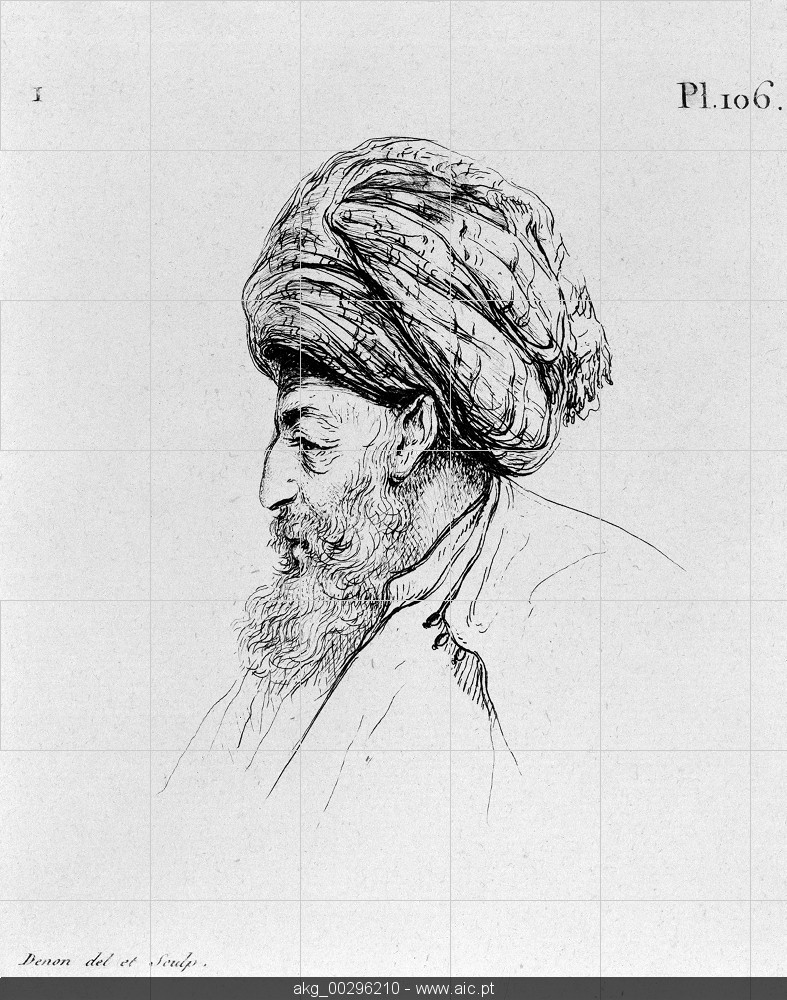
Mustafa Pasha, commander of the Ottoman troops at the Battle of Abukir on June 25, 1799

Mustafa Pasha was an Ottoman commander, born in Edirne and a paternal Uncle of Muhammad Ali of Egypt, who had fought against Russia and Napoleon's army in Egypt. He lost the Battle of Abukir in 1799. Mustafa Pasha was an ethnic Albanian.
