= Henri de Pavin de Lafarge =

French businessman and politician

Henri Pavin de Lafarge
- Born: 17 October 1889; Viviers, Ardèche, France
- Died: 30 June 1965 (aged 75); Viviers, Ardèche, France
- Education: École Centrale Paris
- Occupation: Politician
- Parent: Auguste de Lafarge

Henri Pavin de Lafarge (17 October 1889 – 30 June 1965) was a French businessman and politician. He served as a member of the French Senate from 1930 to 1945, where he represented Ardèche as a member of the Republican Federation.

On 10 July 1940, he voted in favour of granting the cabinet presided by Marshal Philippe Pétain authority to draw up a new constitution, thereby effectively ending the French Third Republic and establishing Vichy France. On 23 January 1941, he was made a member of the National Council of Vichy France.
