= Second Siege of El Arish =

1799 battle of the French invasion of Egypt and Syria

Coordinates: 31°7′37″N 33°48′11″E

- Part of the French invasion of Egypt and Syria
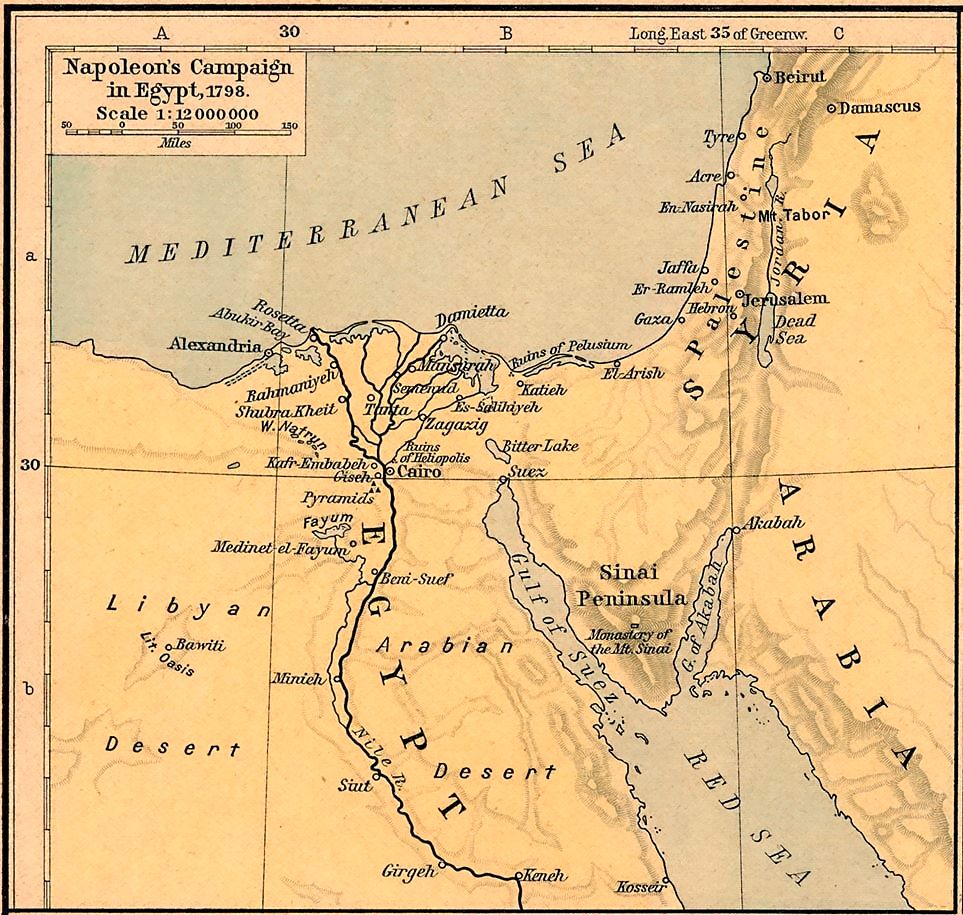
- Map of the French invasion
Date	23 December 1799
Location	El Arish, Ottoman Egypt
Result	Ottoman victory

Belligerents
Ottoman Empire	France

Commanders and leaders
Yusuf Pasha	Louis-Joseph Elisabeth Cazals

Strength
14,000	300

Casualties and losses
Unknown	Most killed

The siege of El Arish was a military engagement between the French garrison of El Arish and the Ottoman army during the French invasion of Egypt and Syria. The Ottomans attacked and invested in the fort, massacring the French garrison.

== Background ==
The Ottoman army, led by Kör Yusuf Ziyaüddin Pasha, arrived at Jaffa and began negotiations between the belligerents. The French general, Jean-Baptiste Kléber, dispatched General Louis Desaix and M. Poussielgue to negotiate on Sidney Smith's ship; however, after the appearance of the Ottomans, El Arish, it was important to carry the negotiations with them. However, an unexpected event threatened to prolong the conflict.

== Siege ==
El Arish was garrisoned by 300 French men led by Chef de Bataillon Louis-Joseph Elisabeth Cazals. The Ottoman army consisted of 14,000 men. They besieged the fort on December 23, 1799. The fort was isolated from the main force in Egypt, and the French troops were demoralized by Napoleon's departure of Egypt and wished to see their homeland again. Cazals resolved to defend the fort; however, his troops asked him to surrender the fort. Cazals ordered a captain to attack the Ottomans, who had built trenches around the fort; however, the troops refused to move. Having lost confidence, which created a sign to the Ottomans that they were ready to surrender.

Some of the rebellious troops even pulled down the French flag. The Ottomans, finding that they were not defending, began scaling the walls, which was met with no opposition. The Ottoman prisoners learned of this and began throwing rocks to help the Ottomans enter the walls. The Ottomans then began massacring majority of the French troops. The sick and wounded were killed. Some of the French troops, realizing what happened, regrouped with the rest and defended themselves valiantly; however, almost all of them were massacred.

== Aftermath ==
News of the massacre reached Gaza. Kléber was resentful with what happened and complained to Smith about it. After lengthy discussion, Kléber admitted that the massacre was due to misunderstanding and allowed the negotiations to continue. On January 24, 1800, both sides signed the Convention of El Arish.

== Sources ==
- Andrew Archibald Paton (1863), A History of the Egyptian Revolution, Vol I.
- Walter Frewen Lord (1901), England and France in the Mediterranean, 1660–1830.
- Pierre Gorlier (1970), Le Vigan à travers les siècles, Histoire d'une cité languedocienne.
