= Battle of Heliopolis (1800) =

1800 battle of the French invasion of Egypt and Syria

Coordinates: 30°10′N 31°20′E

- Part of the French invasion of Egypt and Syria
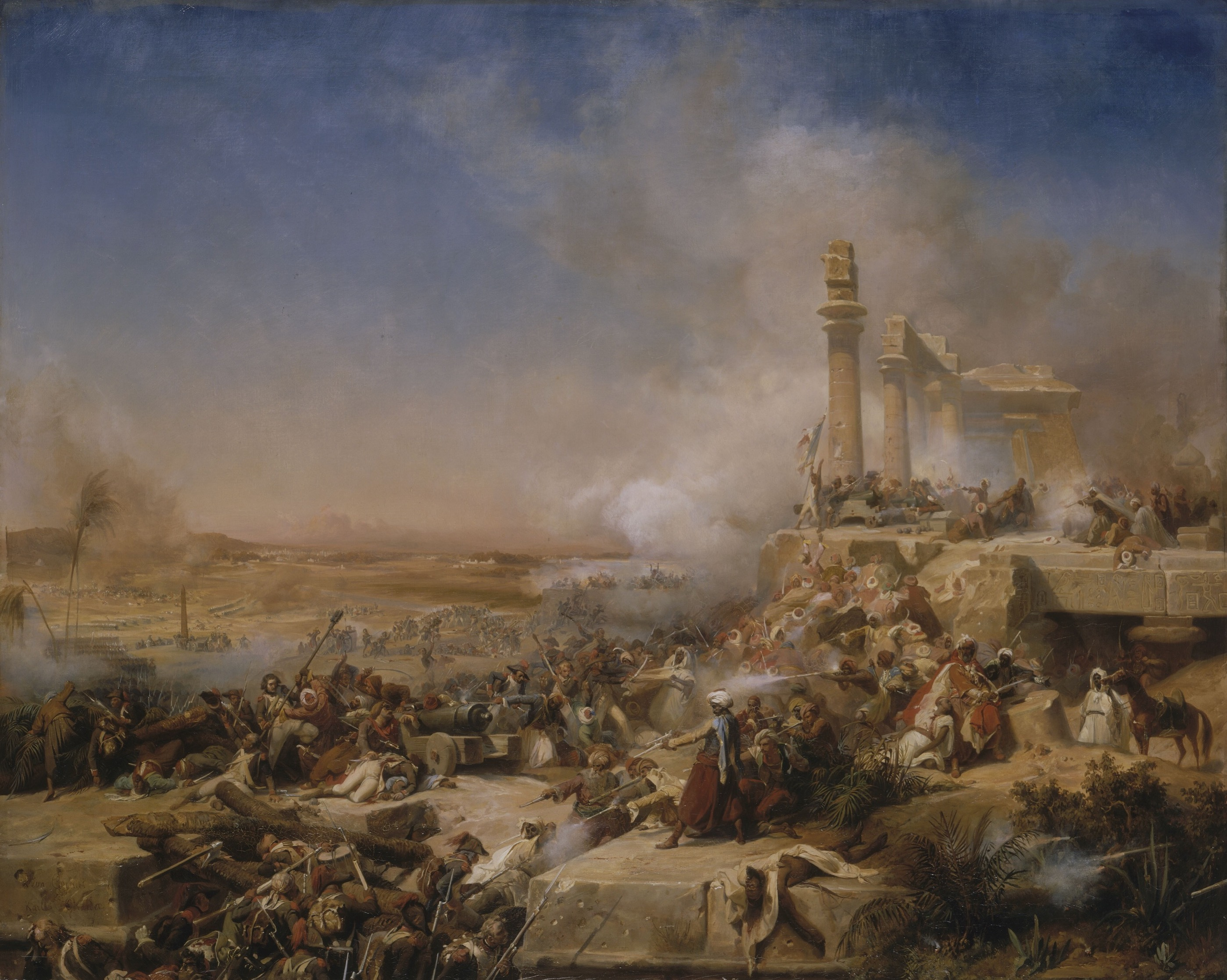
- The Battle of Heliopolis (1837)
Date	20 March 1800
Location	Heliopolis, Ottoman Egypt
Result	French victory

Belligerents
France	Ottoman Empire

Commanders and leaders
Jean-Baptiste Kléber	Nassif Pasha; Ibrahim Bey

Units involved
Army of the Orient	Ottoman Army; Mamluks

Strength
10,000–12,000	50,000–60,000

Casualties and losses
600 killed or wounded	9,000–10,000 killed, wounded or captured
- Location within Mediterranean Battle of Heliopolis (1800) (Earth)

The Battle of Heliopolis was fought between the French Army of the Orient under the command of General Jean-Baptiste Kléber and an Ottoman army at Heliopolis on 20 March 1800. The French were victorious, inflicting over 9,000 casualties on the Ottomans while suffering only 600 killed or wounded.

== Background ==
Ever since Napoleon left Egypt in September 1799, the commander of the Army of the Orient, General Jean-Baptiste Kléber, had been attempting to evacuate his army and return to Europe. On 24 January 1800, Kléber signed the Convention of El Arish with Kör Yusuf Ziyaüddin Pasha in Commodore Sidney Smith's presence which stipulated that the Army of the Orient would be allowed to evacuate Egypt and return to friendly ports in Europe.

However, Smith had overreached his authority by approving of the convention, since the Pitt ministry had in December 1799 forbidden British commanders from going along with such a treaty, though this was not communicated to Smith until after the convention was signed. Smith and his superior Lord Keith both sent letters to Kléber informing him that the British government would only consent to an unconditional French surrender. An outraged Kléber decided to renew hostilities, as he refused to surrender. The Ottomans believed the Army of the Orient was now too weakened to offer battle, and so Yusuf Pasha ordered Nassif Pasha to march on Cairo, where the local population obeyed his call to revolt against French rule.

== Battle ==
Although, he had no more than 10,000 men, Kléber opted for an engagement with the vastly larger Ottoman army. The French advanced to Mataria, where they arrived on the morning of 20 March at 3 p.m. They organized themselves into four square formations. The corners of the squares had artillery and grenadiers. The left wing of the French was commanded by General Jean Reynier, with his division including the Joseph Lagrange and Antoine Joseph Robin brigades, and the right wing by General Louis Friant, with his division made up by the Augustin Daniel Belliard and François-Xavier Donzelot brigades. Kléber called on Murad Bey to support his right wing with his Mamluk cavalry, as well. He mustered his Mamluks but deserted the French flank before the battle and did not participate in the fighting. Kléber commanded the center of the forces, in which Pierre Leclerc d'Ostein led the French light cavalry in the center of the forces.

Reynier's left wing struck directly against Mataria's Janissaries as Friant cut off their retreat route. The French cavalry, in turn, clashed with the Ottoman cavalry. In addition to the Turks, the Ottoman side had Mamluk cavalry. The Janissaries were defeated relatively quickly and the French began to move towards the main Ottoman forces in the direction of Heliopolis. In Heliopolis, the Ottomans were led by Nassif Pasha. The Ottomans launched an attack on the French, which proved disorganized. The attack caught fire with the French cannon fire and turned into an uncontrollable retreat. Eventually, the French also reached the Ottoman camp. The Ottoman army then evacuated and fled to Syria.

== Aftermath ==
The losses of the French in the battle remained very small. There were only about 600 French casualties. There were around 9,000 to 10,000 casualties on the Ottoman side. Kléber had managed to save the seemingly desperate situation, at least for the time being. He was also able to quell the uprising that erupted in Cairo and retook the city. The position of the French was further strengthened with Kléber's recruitment of local auxiliaries and his alliance with his former enemy Murad Bey. However, Kléber was assassinated later that year and his successor, Jacques-François Menou, was considered a much weaker leader.

== Gallery ==
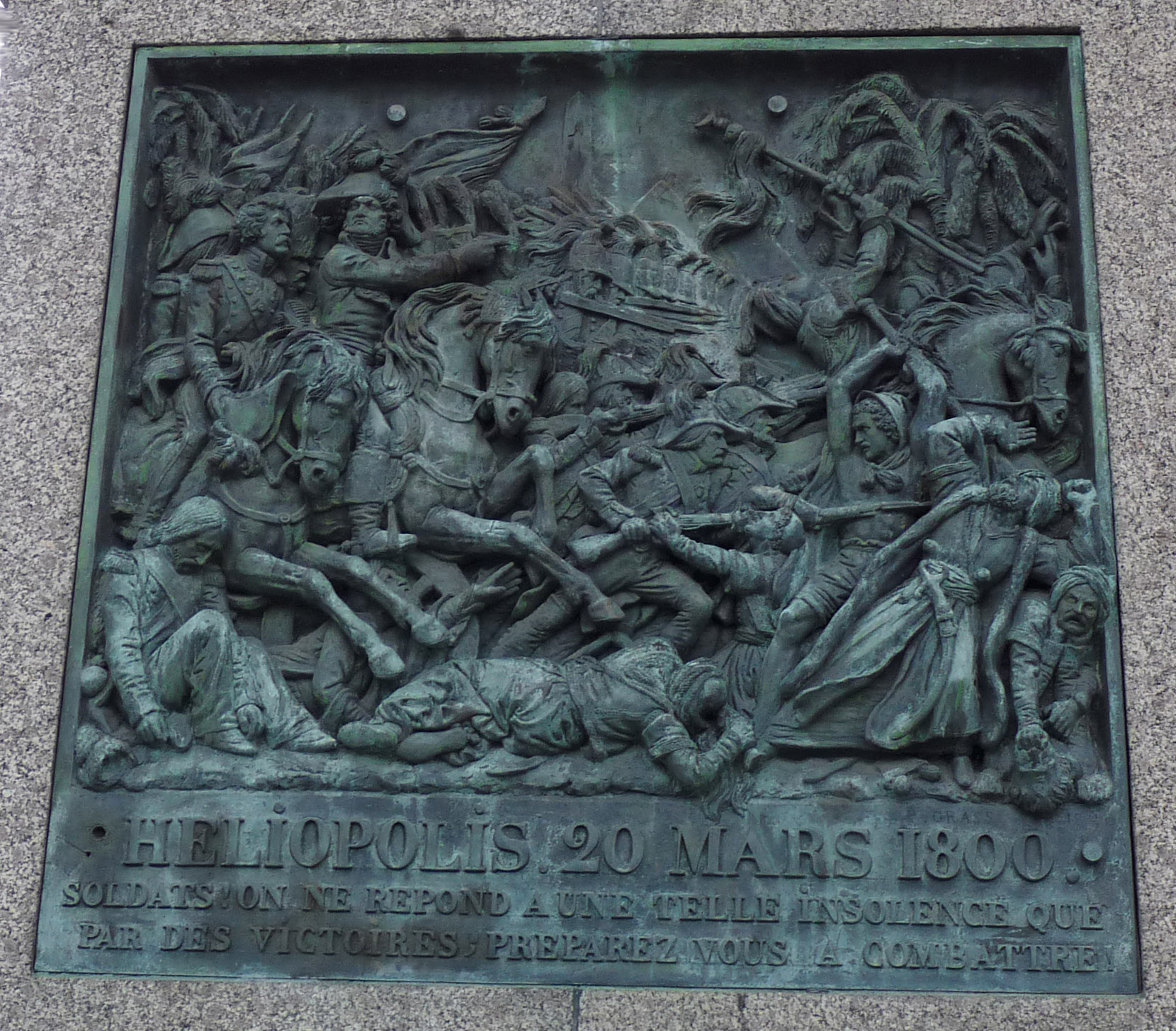
Le général Kléber victorieux à Héliopolis, 20 mars 1800, by Philippe Grass. Public sculpture at Place Kléber, Strasbourg.

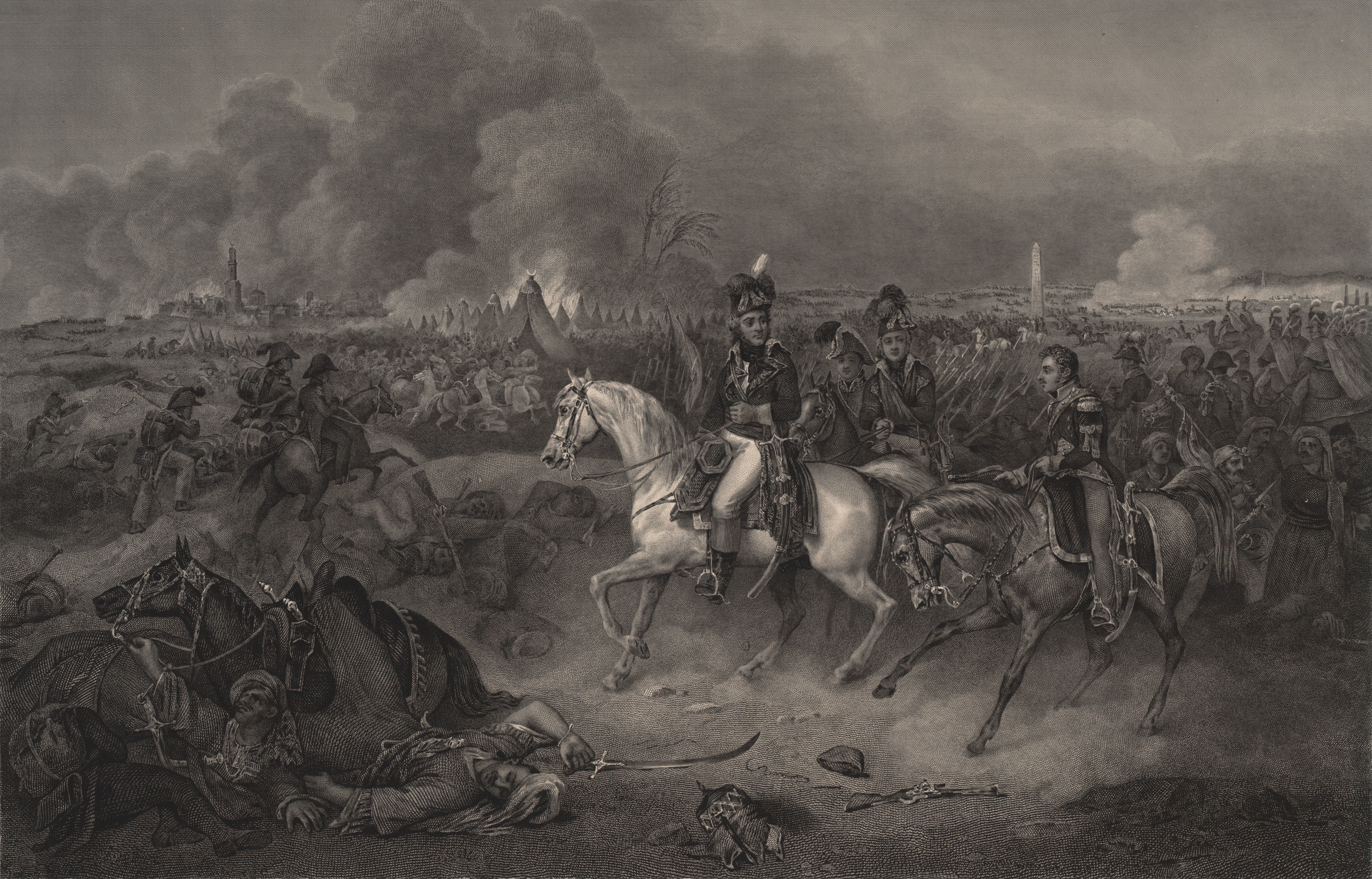
Bataille d'Héliopolis, engraved by Jeune Lefevre, from a painting by Jean-Charles Langlois
