= The Battle of Heliopolis =

Painting by Léon Cogniet

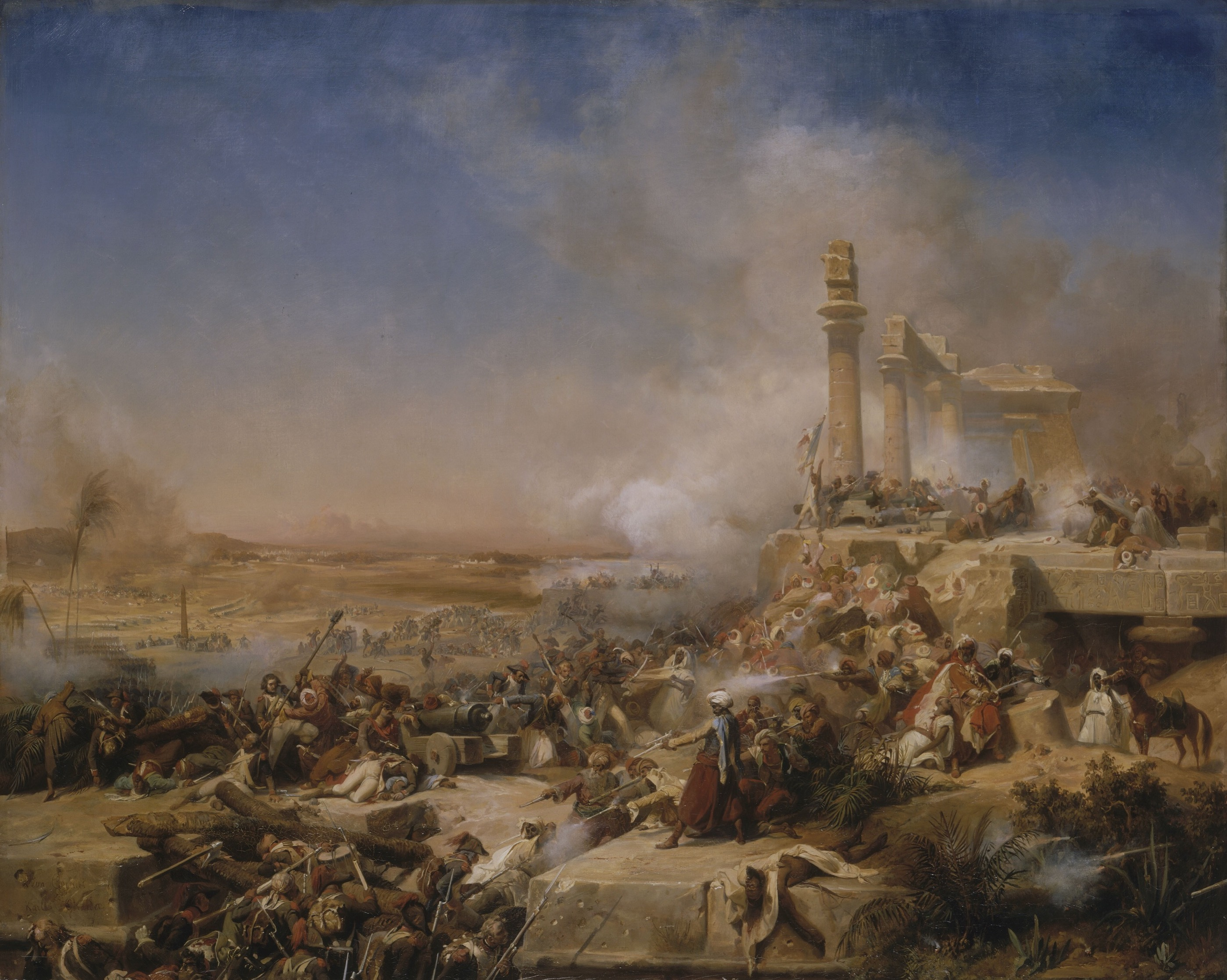
- Artist: Léon Cogniet
- Year: 1837
- Medium: Oil on canvas
- Dimensions: 120 cm × 149 cm (47 in × 59 in)
- Location: Palace of Versailles, Versailles

The Battle of Heliopolis (French: Bataille D'Heliopolis) is an oil on canvas history painting by the French artist Léon Cogniet, from 1837. It is held at the Palace of Versailles, in Versailles.

== History and description ==
It depicts the Battle of Heliopolis, fought on 20 March 1800 at Heliopolis, on the outskirts of Cairo, in Egypt, Ottoman Empire. The battle, which took place during the French invasion of Egypt, allowed the invaders to suppress an uprising against their control. The scene takes place in a vast, exotic landscape, where some Ancient Egypt ruins are visible

In the 1830s during the July Monarchy, the French monarch Louis Philippe I announced the restoration of the former Ancien Régime Palace of Versailles as a history museum. A large number of works were commissioned featuring moments from French history. With his depiction of Heliopolis, Cogniet was one of many leading French painters who produced works for Versailles. He was paid three thousand Francs for the works. Today the painting remains at Versailles.

== Bibliography ==
- Metzger, Franziska & Sproll, Heinz . Abendlanddiskurse und Erinnerungsräume Europas im 19. und 20. Jahrhundert. Böhlau Köln, 2022.
- Ross, Steven T. The A to Z of the Wars of the French Revolution. Scarecrow Press, 2010.
