= Heliopolis (ancient Egypt) =

Ancient Egyptian city located in present-day Ayn Shams, Cairo

- Jwnw or Iunu
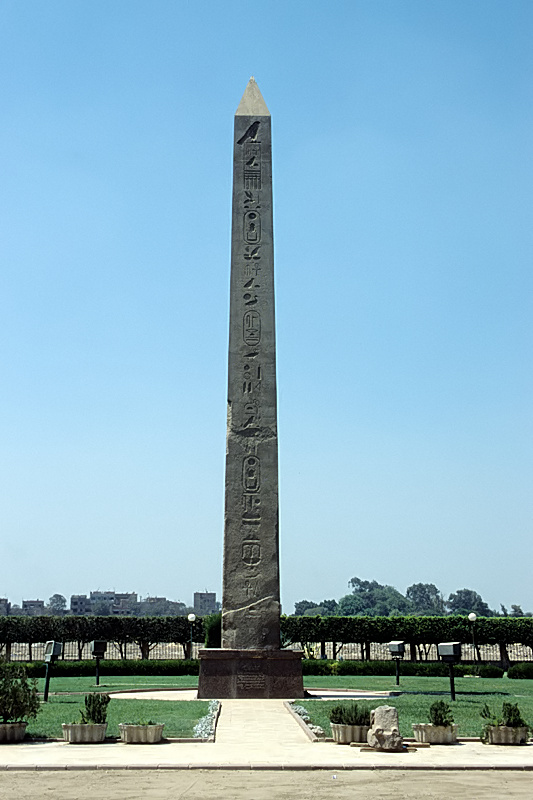
- Al-Masalla obelisk, the largest surviving monument from Heliopolis, pictured in 2001.

- Location within Egypt
- 30.129333°N 31.307528°E
- Location: Egypt
- Region: Cairo Governorate

Heliopolis (Jwnw, Iunu; Ancient Egyptian: 𓉺𓏌𓊖, romanized: jwnw, lit. 'the Pillars'; Coptic: ⲱⲛ, Biblical Hebrew: אֹן, romanized: ʾOn; Greek: Ἡλιούπολις, romanized: Hēlioúpolis, lit. 'City of the Sun') was a major city of ancient Egypt. It was the capital of the Heliopolite or 13th Nome (province or district) of Lower Egypt and a major religious centre. Its site is within the boundaries of Ain Shams and El Matareya districts (kism) in northeastern Cairo.

One of the oldest cities of ancient Egypt, occupied since prehistoric Egypt, it greatly expanded under the Old and Middle Kingdoms. Today it is mostly ruined, as its temples and other buildings having been scavenged for the construction of medieval Cairo. Most information about the ancient city comes from surviving records.

A major surviving remnant of Heliopolis is the obelisk of the Temple of Ra-Atum erected by Senusret I of the Twelfth Dynasty. It remains in its original position (now in el-Masalla, El Matareya). The 21 m (69 ft) high red granite obelisk weighs 120 tons (240,000 lbs) and is believed to be the oldest surviving obelisk in the world.

Other obelisks originating in Heliopolis were taken by the Romans after their conquest of Egypt. The taller 25 m (82 ft) Vatican obelisk, was taken by Emperor Caligula, and now stands in St. Peter's Square, the only ancient obelisk in Rome never to have fallen. Emperor Augustus took the Obelisk of Montecitorio from Heliopolis to Rome, where it remains.

Two smaller obelisks called Cleopatra's Needles, now in London and New York, were also originally from Heliopolis.

== Names ==
iwn nw niwt
Heliopolis
iwnw (Note: Variant representations of Iunu include iwn.)
in hieroglyphs

Heliopolis is the Latinised form of the Greek name Hēlioúpolis (Ἡλιούπολις), meaning "City of the Sun". The Egyptian gods Ra and Atum, whose principal cult was located in the city, were interpreted by ancient Greeks as, and thus identified with, Helios, the personified and deified form of the sun.

Its traditional Egyptological transcription is Iunu. Its native name was iwnw "The Pillars". The exact pronunciation is uncertain because ancient Egyptian recorded only consonantal values.

Some scholars reconstruct its pronunciation in earlier Egyptian as *ʔa:wnu, perhaps from older /ja:wunaw/. Variant transcriptions include Awnu and Annu. The name survived as Coptic ⲱⲛ Ōn.

The city is called "House of Ra" in the Pyramid Texts, which date to the Old Kingdom of Egypt.

It appears as ʾOn (Biblical Hebrew: אֹן) in Genesis 41:45 and 50 and ʾĀwen (אָוֶן) in Ezekiel 30:17 and Amos 1:5 (apparently Baalbek). This later form would be the expected form in pausa, but perhaps is a play on awen "idolatry."

== History ==
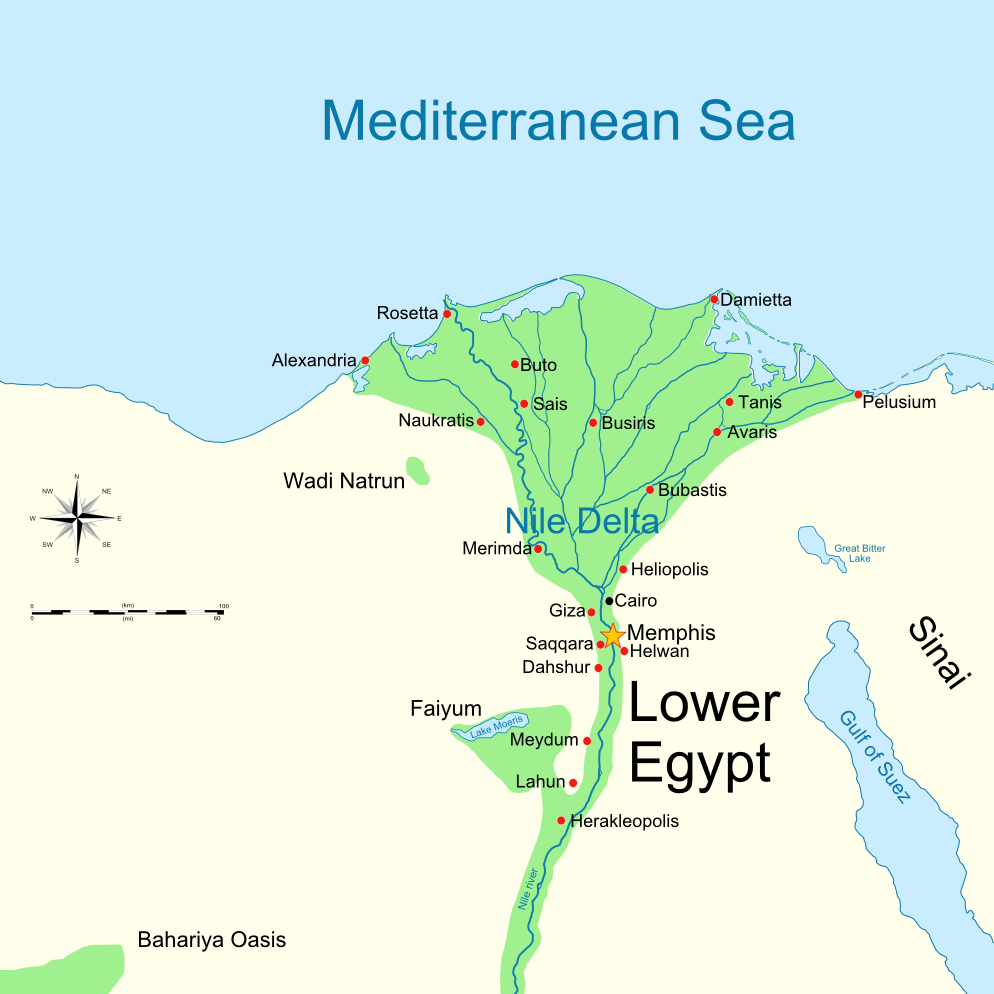
Map of ancient Lower Egypt showing Heliopolis

=== Ancient ===
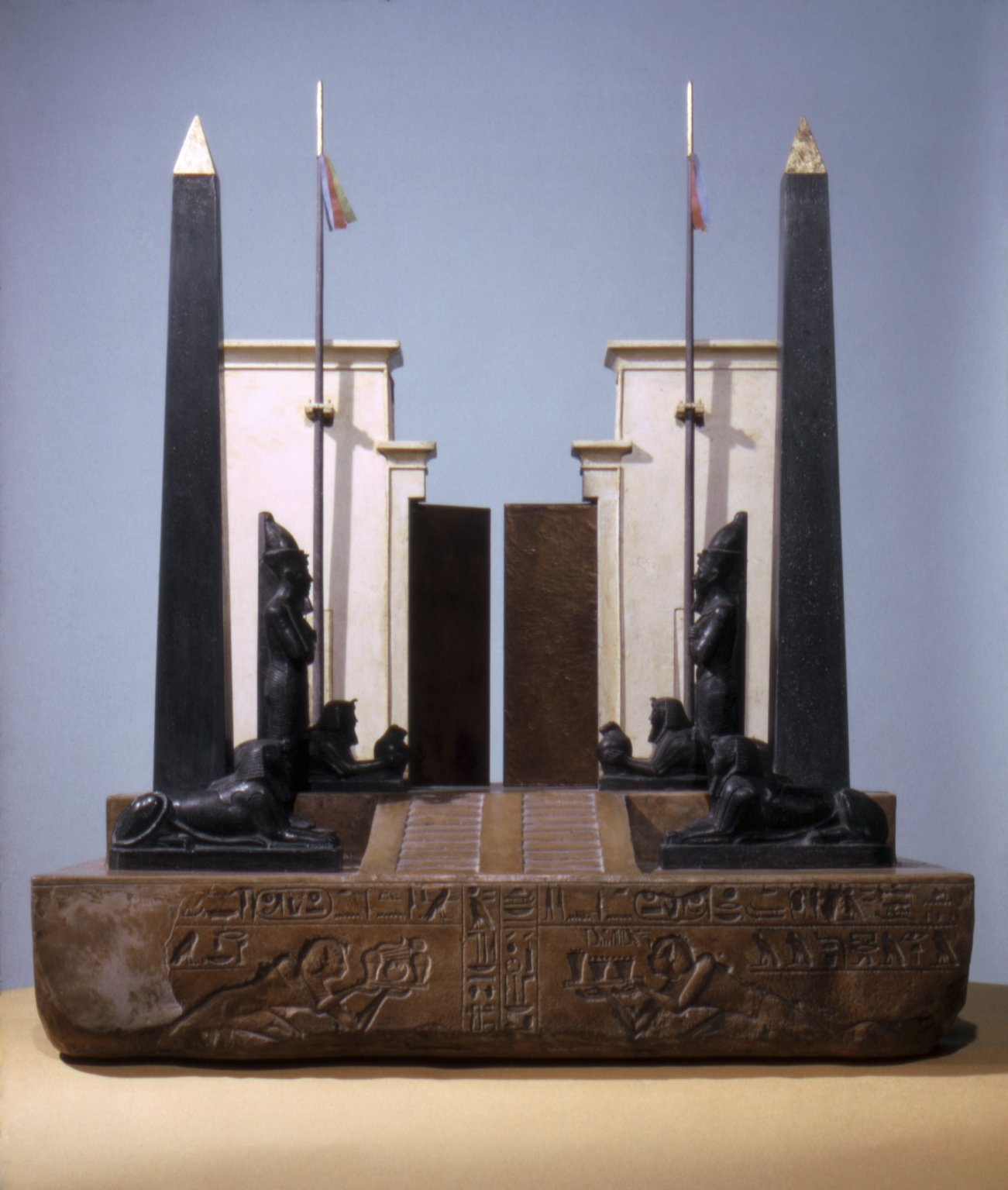
Model of a Votive Temple Gateway at Heliopolis, Dynasty XIX

Before the Pharonic period Heliopolis was a settlement of Stone Age farmers.

Heliopolis was the principal cult center of the solar deity Atum, who came to be identified with Ra and then with Horus as Ra-harakhty. The primary temple of the city was known as the "Great House" (Ancient Egyptian: Pr Ꜥꜣt *Par ʻĀʾat) or "House of Atum" (Ancient Egyptian: Pr I͗tmw *Par-ʼAtāma, Biblical Hebrew: פתם, romanized: Pithom). Its priests maintained that Atum or Ra was the first being, rising self-created from the primeval waters. A decline in the importance of Ra's cult during the Fifth Dynasty led to the development of the Ennead, a grouping of nine major Egyptian deities that placed the others in subordinate status to Ra–Atum. The High Priests of Ra are not as well documented as those of other deities, although the high priests of Dynasty VI (c. 2345 – c. 2181 BC) have been discovered and excavated.

During the Amarna Period of the Eighteenth Dynasty, Pharaoh Akhenaten introduced a kind of henotheistic worship of Aten, the deified solar disc. He built a temple named "Elevating Aten" (Wcs I͗tn), whose stones can still be seen in some of the gates of Cairo's medieval city wall. The cult of the Mnevis bull, another embodiment of the Sun, also had its altar here. The bulls' formal burial ground was situated north of the city.

In the Septuagint in Exodus 1:11, Heliopolis is mentioned as being one of the places that was rebuilt by enslaved Hebrews. The store-city Pithom in the same passage is, according to one theory, Heliopolis. Today, it is generally believed that Pithom is the archaeological site of either Tell el-Retabeh or Tell el-Maschuta.

The Metternich Stela, dating to the reign of Nectanebo II (360–343 BCE), was originally erected at Heliopolis. Its inscriptions and reliefs contain protective spells against snakebites and scorpion stings, providing evidence of ancient Egyptian healing and magical practices.

=== Hellenistic ===
Alexander the Great halted at Heliopolis on his march from Pelusium to Memphis.

The temple of Ra was said to have been, to a special degree, a depository for royal records, and Herodotus states that the priests of Heliopolis were the best informed in matters of history of all the Egyptians. Heliopolis flourished as a seat of learning during the Greek period; the schools of philosophy and astronomy are claimed to have been frequented by Orpheus, Homer, Pythagoras, Plato, Solon, and other Greek philosophers. Ichonuphys was lecturing there in 308 BC, and the Greek mathematician Eudoxus, who was one of his pupils, learned from him the true length of the year and month, upon which he formed his octaeterid, or period of 8 years or 99 months.

Ptolemy II had Manetho, the chief priest of Heliopolis, collect his history of the ancient kings of Egypt from its archives.

The later Greek rulers, the Ptolemies, probably took little interest in their "father" Ra, as Greeks were never much of sun worshipers. The Ptolemies favored the cult of Serapis, and Alexandria had eclipsed the learning of Heliopolis. Thus, with the withdrawal of royal favour, Heliopolis quickly dwindled, and the students of native lore deserted it for other temples supported by a wealthy population of pious citizens. By the first century BC, Strabo found the temples deserted, and the town itself almost uninhabited, although priests were still present.

Heliopolis was well known to the ancient Greeks and Romans, being noted by most major geographers of the period, including Ptolemy, Herodotus, and others, down to the Byzantine geographer Stephanus of Byzantium.

=== Roman ===
In Roman Egypt, Heliopolis belonged to the province Augustamnica, causing it to appear as Heliopolis in Augustamnica when it needed to be distinguished from Roman Heliopolis. Its population probably contained a considerable Arabian element. Many of the city's obelisks were removed to adorn more northern cities of the Delta and Rome. Two of these eventually became London's Cleopatra's Needle and its twin in New York's Central Park.

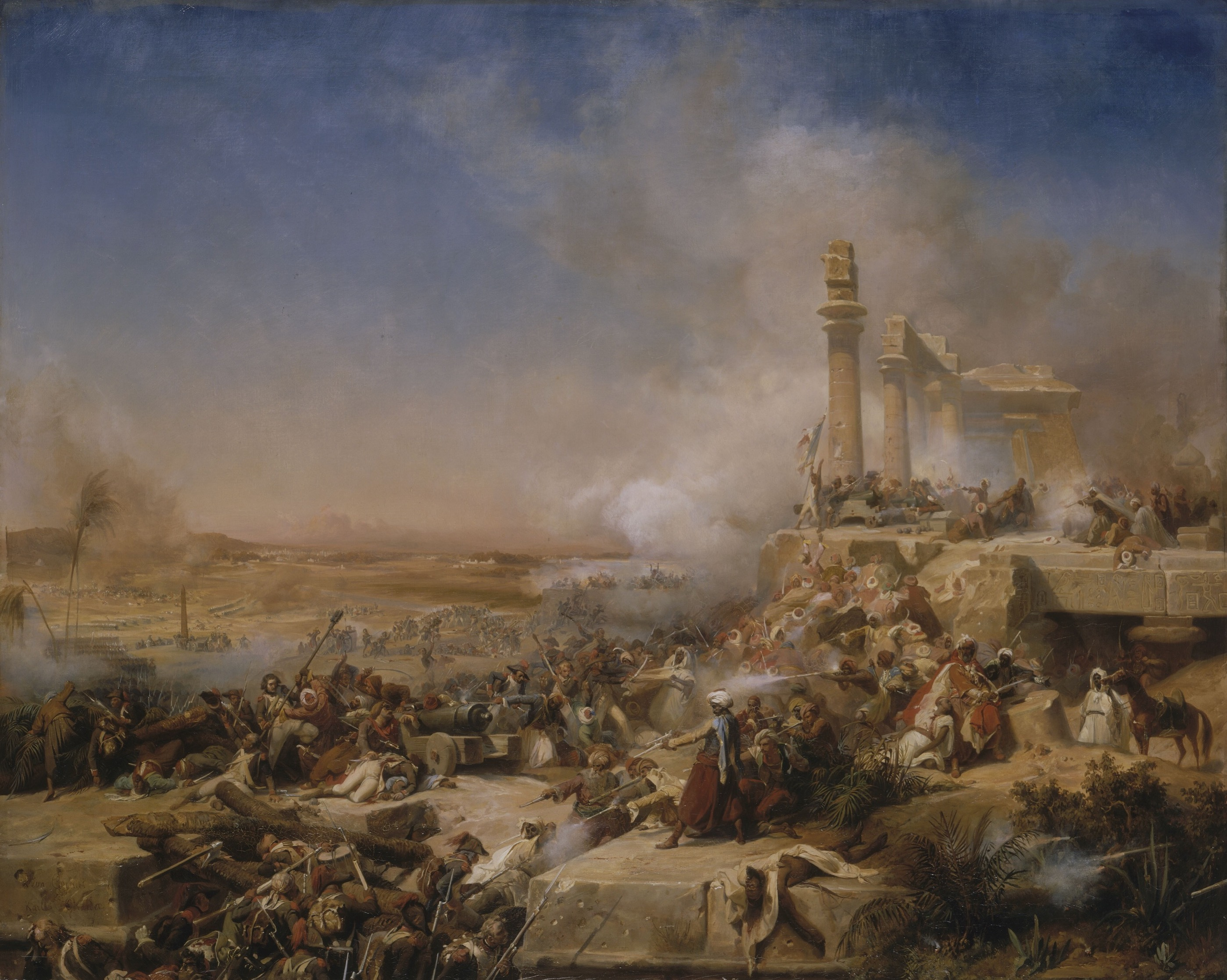
The Battle of Heliopolis by Léon Cogniet. The Battle of Heliopolis took place during Napoleon's invasion of Egypt in 1800

=== Islamic ===
During the Middle Ages, the expansion of nearby Cairo and Fustat drove a surge in demand for construction materials. Builders stripped the ruins of Heliopolis to supply stone for walls and structures in the rapidly growing cities. The site became known locally as the "Eye of the Sun" (Arabic: Ain Shams and ʻArab al-Ḥiṣn).

== Legacy ==
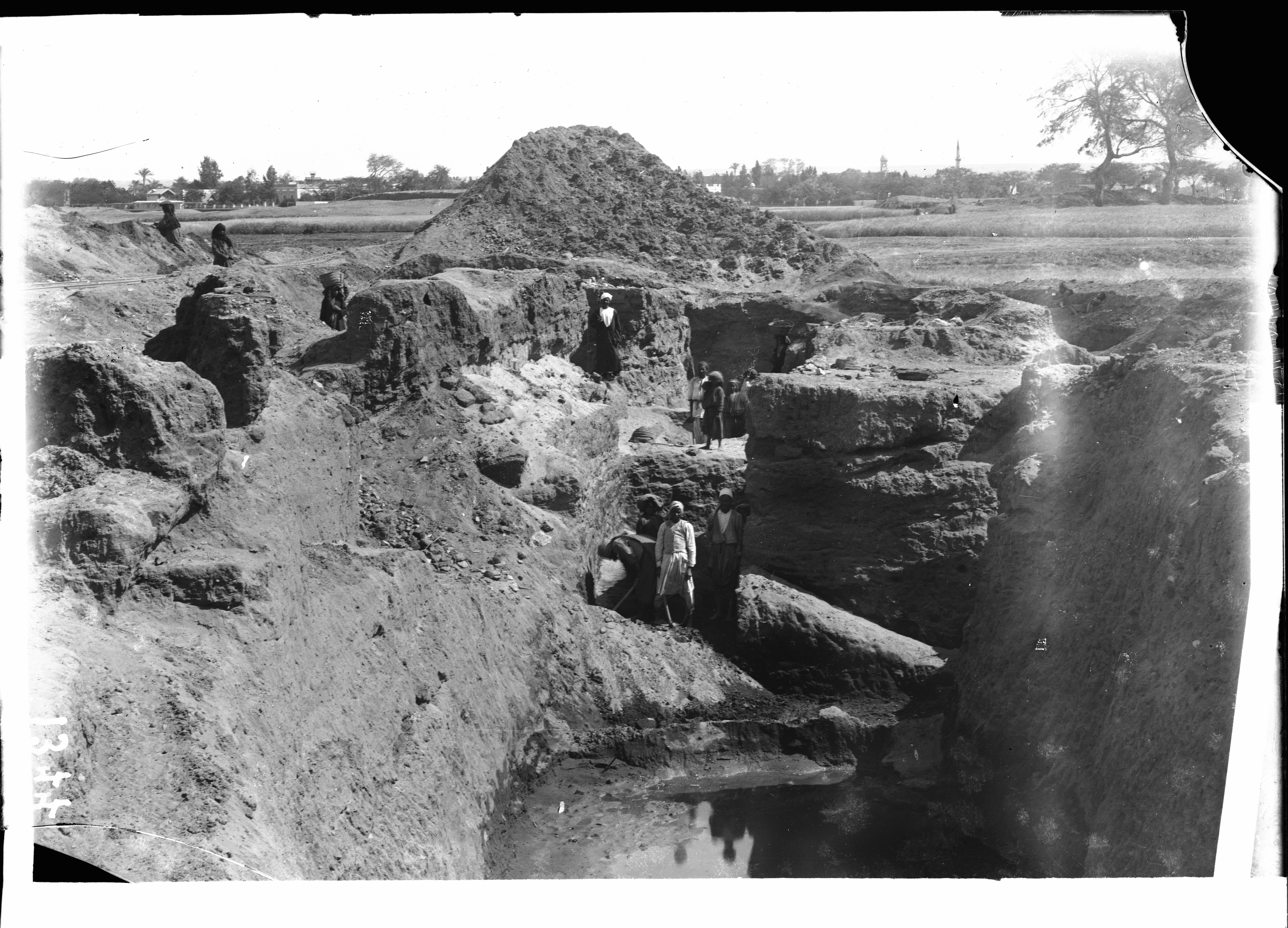
Excavations by Ernesto Schiaparelli at Heliopolis, area of the temenos and surroundings, 1903-1906.

The importance of the solar cult at Heliopolis is reflected in both ancient pagan and current monotheistic beliefs. Classical mythology held that the Egyptian bennu, renamed phoenix, brought the remains of its predecessor to the altar of the sun god at Heliopolis each time it was reborn. In the Hebrew Bible, Heliopolis is referenced directly and obliquely, usually in reference to its prominent pagan cult. In his prophesies against Egypt, Isaiah claimed the "City of the Sun" (Hebrew: עיר החרס) would be one of the five Egyptian cities to follow the Lord of Heaven's army and speak Hebrew. (Note: Variant texts read "City of Destruction" (עיר ההרס) instead.) Jeremiah and Ezekiel mention the House or Temple of the Sun (Hebrew: בֵּית שֶׁמֶשׁ, romanized: bêṯ šemeš) and Ôn, claiming Nebuchadnezzar II of the Neo-Babylonian Empire would shatter its obelisks and burn its temple and that its "young men of Folly" (Aven) would "fall by the sword".

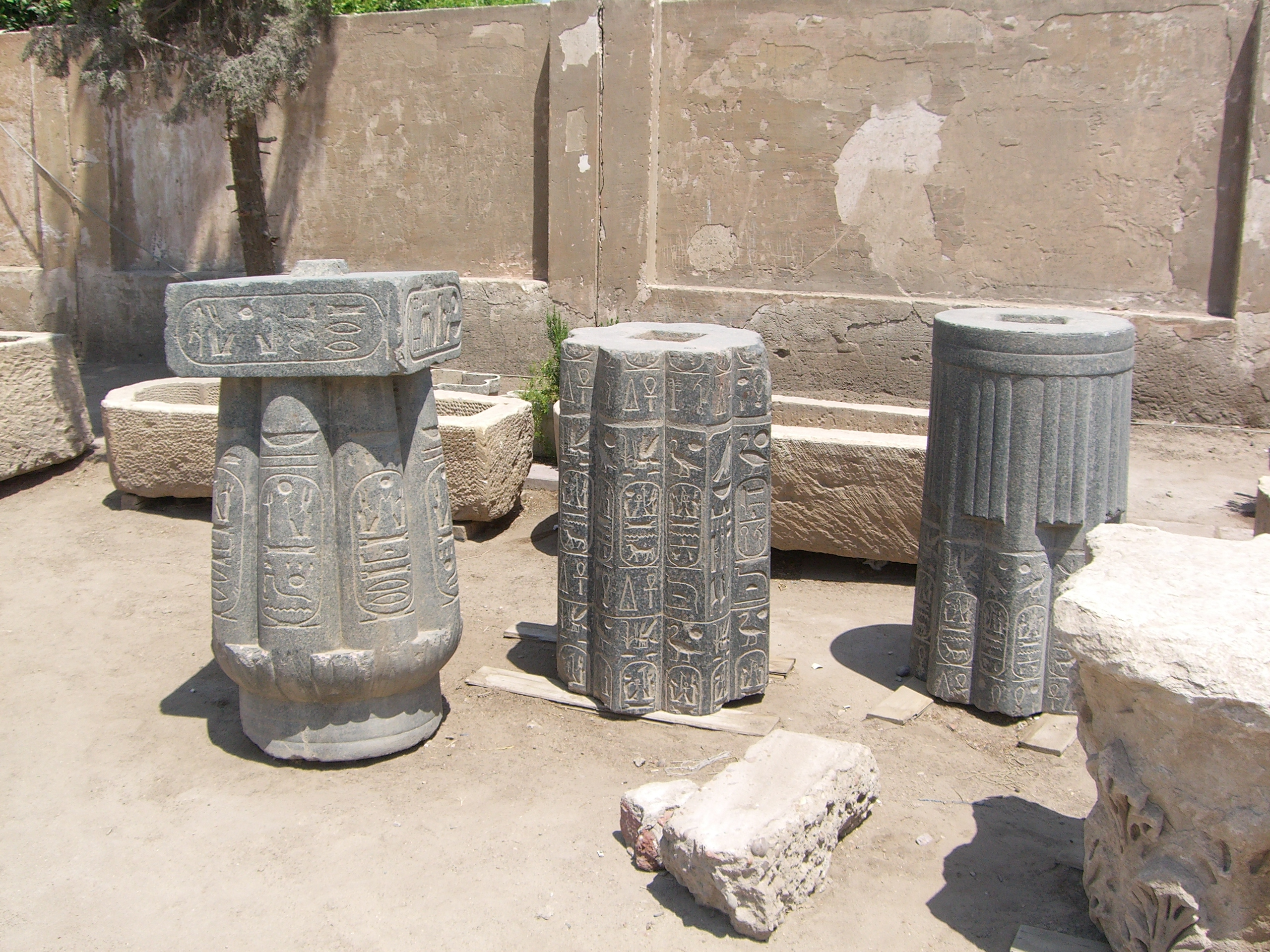
Papyrus shaped columns with the names of Amenhotep III and Merneptah in the Heliopolis open air museum.

The "Syrian Heliopolis" Baalbek has been claimed to have gained its solar cult from a priest colony emigrating from Egypt.

The Titular Episcopal See of Heliopolis in Augustamnica remains a titular see of both the Catholic Church and the Eastern Orthodox Church.

== Present site ==
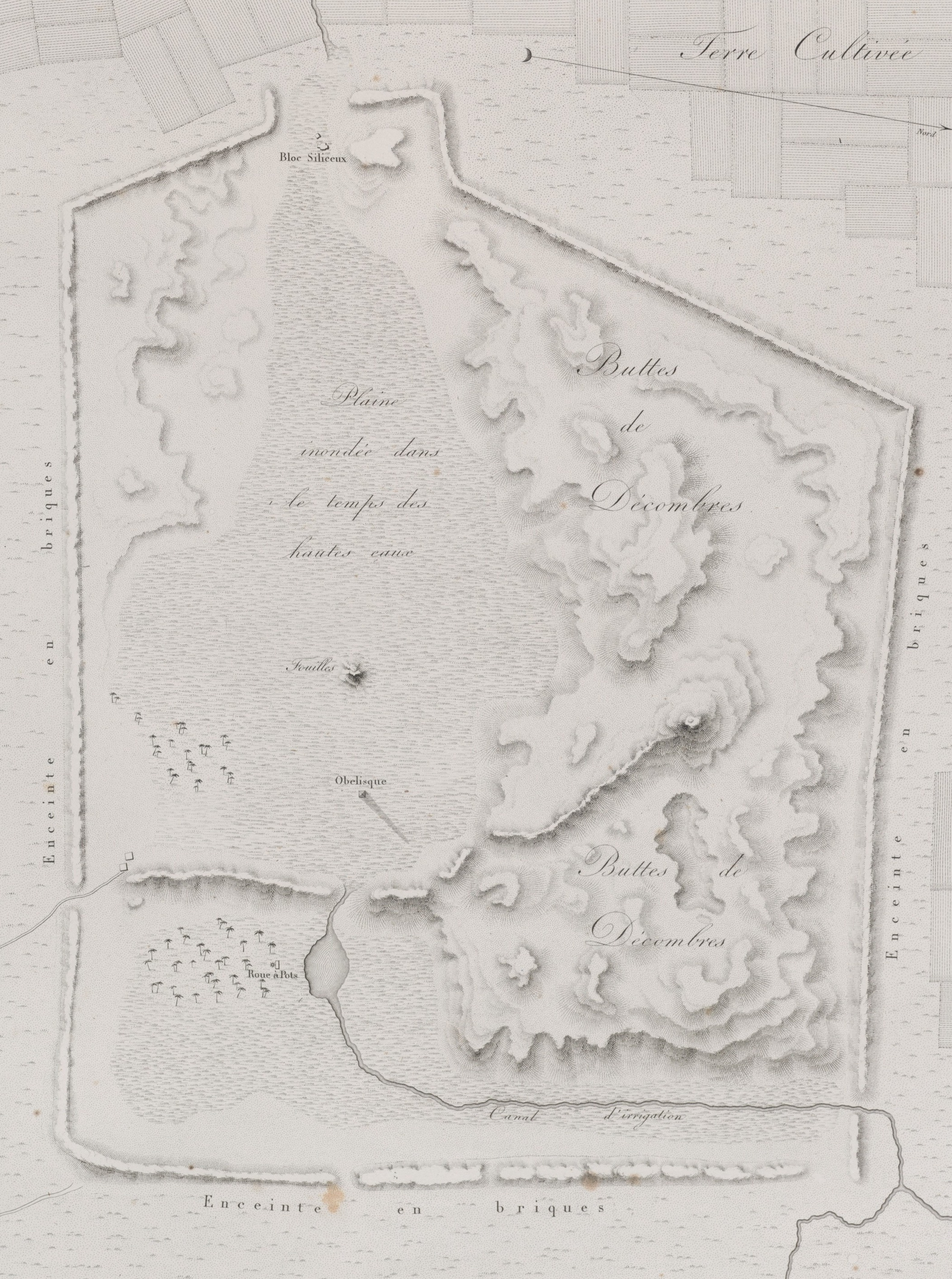
Heliopolis map published in 1809, in the Description de l'Égypte

The ancient city is currently located about 15–20 meters (49–66 ft) below the streets of the middle- and lower-class suburbs of Al-Matariyyah, Ain Shams, and Tel Al-Hisn in northern Cairo. The area is about 1.5 kilometers (1 mi) west of the modern suburb which bears its name.

Some ancient city walls of crude brick can be seen in the fields, a few granite blocks bearing the name of Ramesses II remain, and the position of the great Temple of Ra-Atum is marked by the Al-Masalla obelisk. Archaeologists excavated some of its tombs in 2004. In 2017, parts of a colossal statue of Psamtik I were found and excavated. The site has been excavated a number of times over the years with some results remaining unpublished.

== Gallery ==
A selection of old maps showing Heliopolis are below:

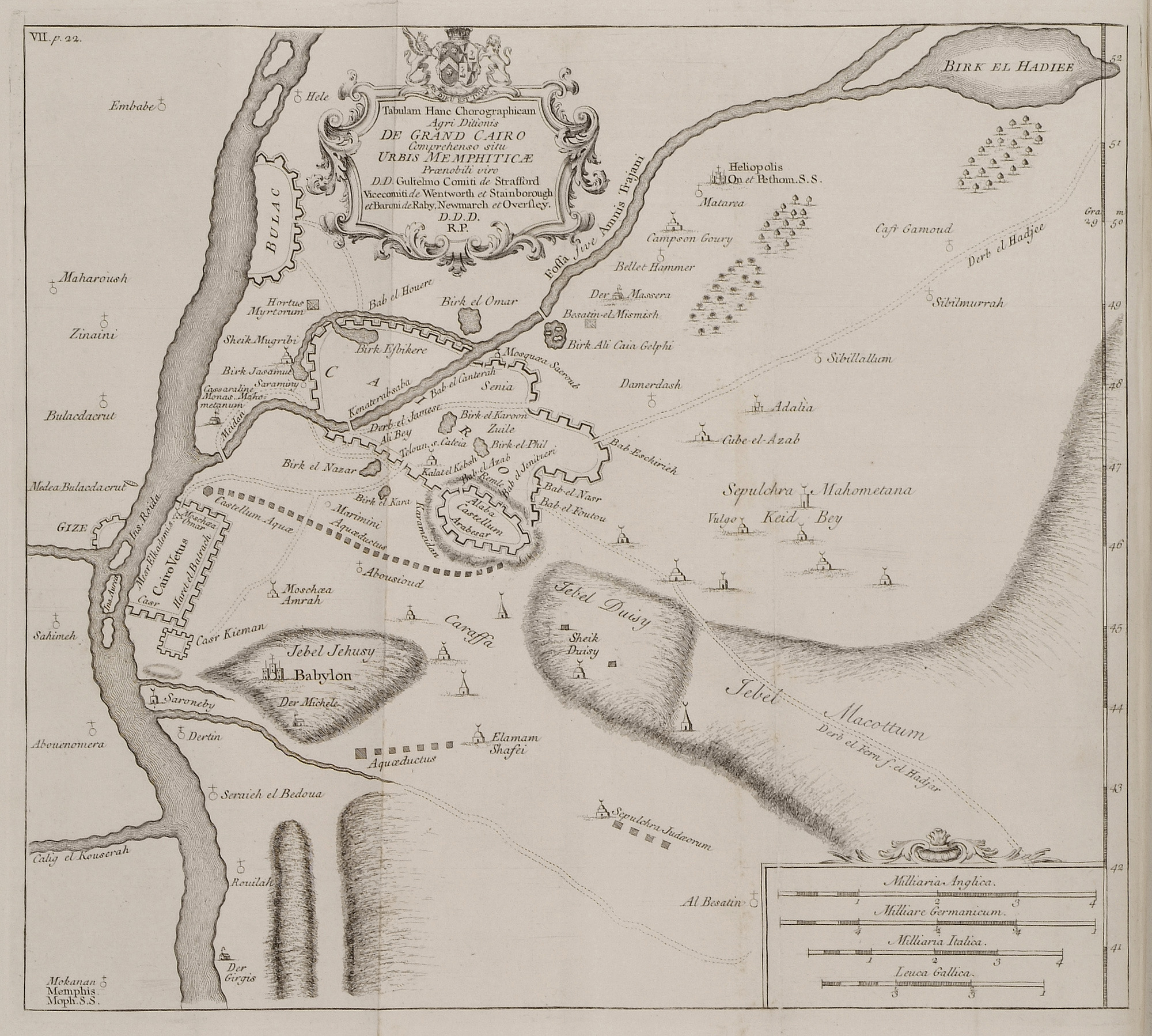
1743 map

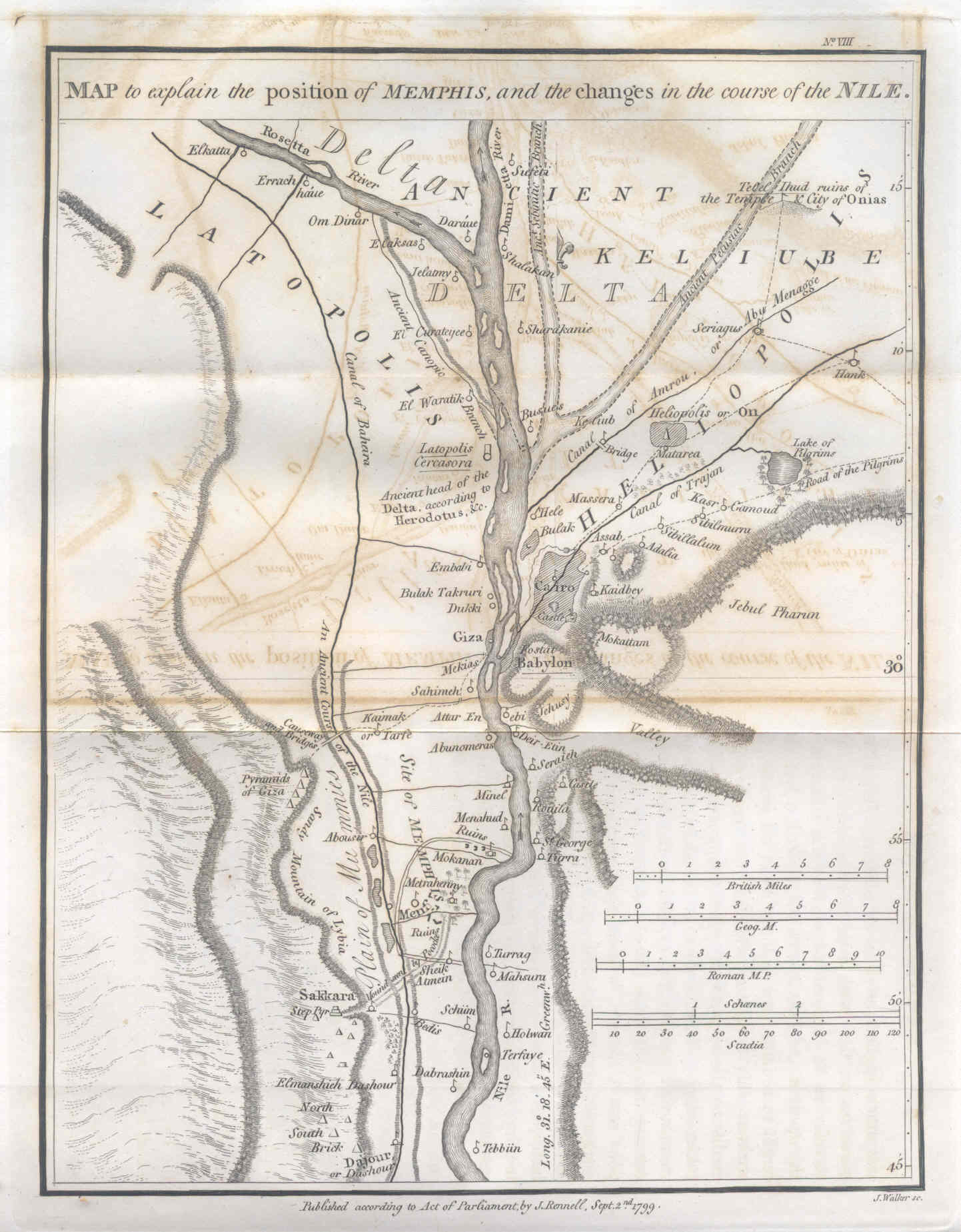
1799 map

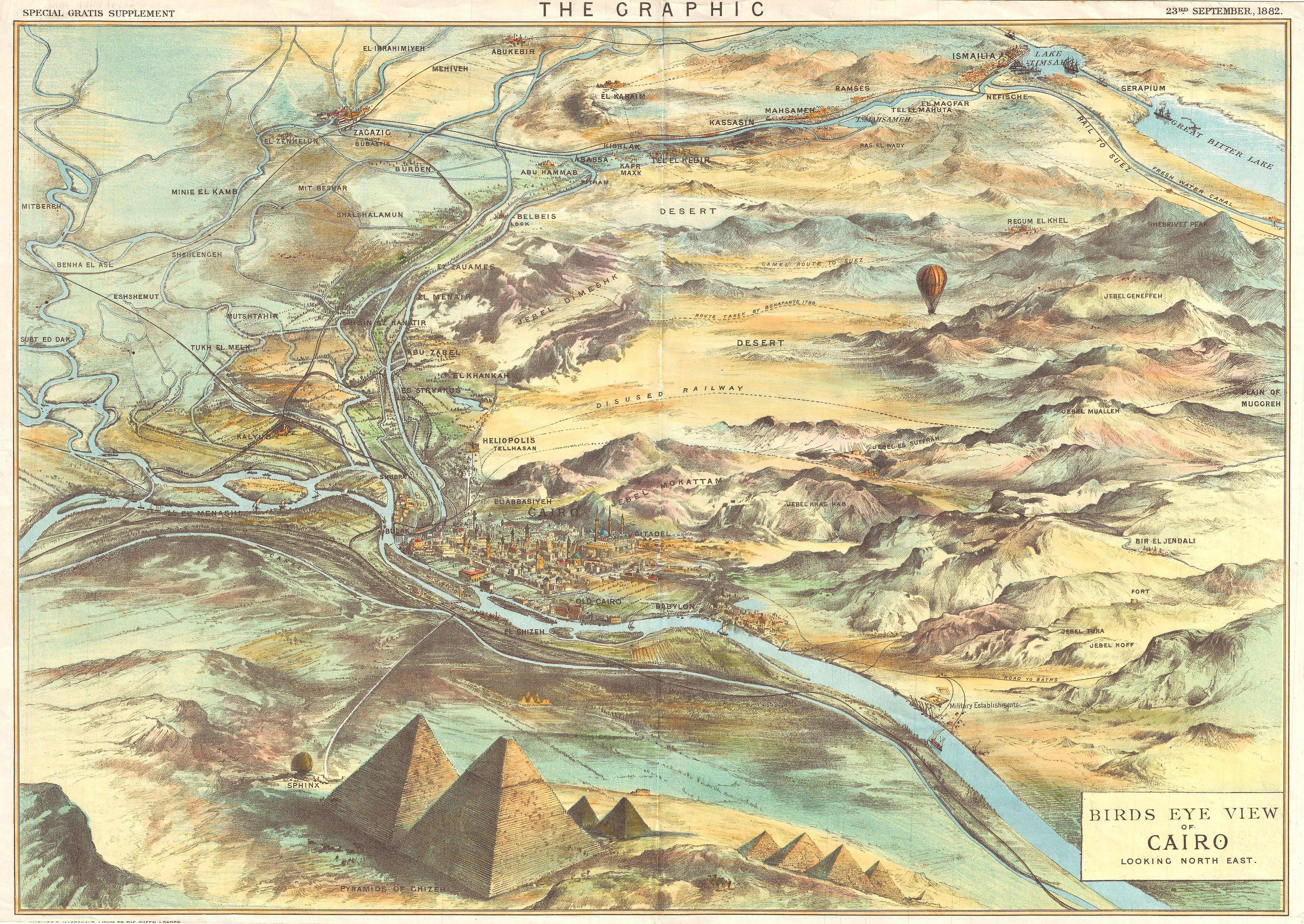
1882 map

== See also ==
- List of ancient Egyptian towns and cities
- Other suburbs with the same name, particularly
  - Heliopolis, the 20th-century suburb of Cairo located near the ancient site.
  - Ilioupoli, the 20th-century suburb of Athens settled by Egyptian Greeks.
- Ancient Egyptian creation myths – in reference to the religious belief system of Iunu at Heliopolis
- List of Egyptian dynasties – in reference to the reigns centered at Heliopolis
- Benben
