= Kör Yusuf Ziyaüddin Pasha =

Grand Vizier of the Ottoman Empire (1798–1805, 1809–1811)

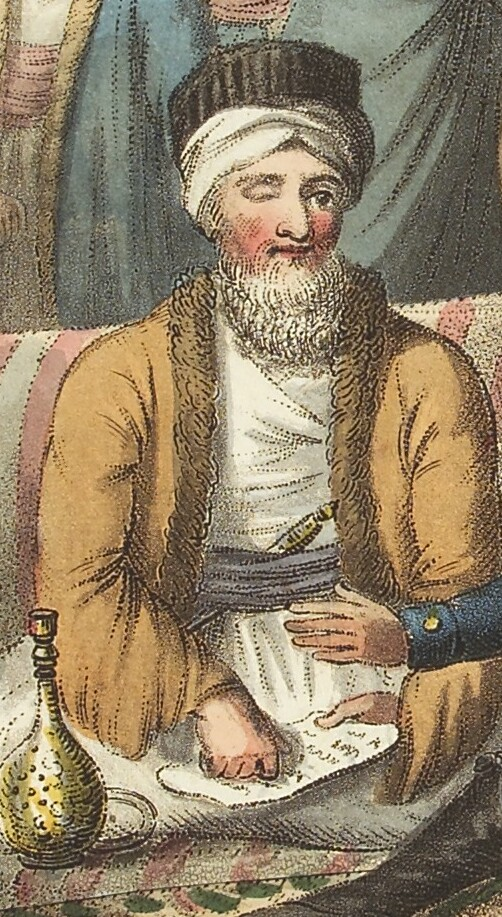
- Portrait of Yusuf in 1800

Grand Vizier of the Ottoman Empire
- In office 25 October 1798 – 21 April 1805
- Monarch: Selim III
- Preceded by: Safranbolulu Izzet Mehmet Pasha
- Succeeded by: Bostancıbaşı Hafız İsmail Pasha
- In office 1 January 1809 – 11 May 1811
- Monarch: Mahmud II
- Preceded by: Çarhacı Ali Pasha
- Succeeded by: Laz Ahmed Pasha

Personal details
- Died: 1819 Chios, Archipelago Eyalet, Ottoman Empire
- Military career
- Allegiance: Ottoman Empire
- Branch: Military of the Ottoman Empire
- Conflicts: French invasion of Egypt and Syria; Second Siege of El Arish; Battle of Al Khankah

Kör Yusuf Ziyaüddin Pasha ("Yusuf Ziyaüddin Pasha the Blind"), also known as Yusuf Ziya Pasha (died 1819), was an Ottoman statesman of Georgian origin, who twice served as the Grand Vizier of the Ottoman Empire in 1798–1805 and 1809–1811. Before, between and after his terms as grand vizier, he served numerous posts as governor of various provinces and districts throughout the empire. As grand vizier, he commanded the Ottoman ground forces against the French Army in the Ottoman reconquest of Egypt and later served as a commander in the Ottoman wars with the Russian Empire.

== Early life and career ==
Kör Yusuf's date of birth is not known. He was of Georgian origin. As a result of an accident while playing javelin he was blinded in one eye, hence his name Kör ("Blind"). Kör Yusuf was known for his fatalism and piety, as well as for being a competent commander. Kör Yusuf started his career as a government clerk then as an intendant of mines. He was promoted to the rank of vezir and was appointed governor of Diyarbekir Eyalet in 1793, then Erzurum Eyalet in 1794 and Childir Eyalet and Trabzon Eyalet in 1796.

== Grand Vizier ==
Kör Yusuf was appointed grand vizier on 25 October 1798 during the sultanate of Selim III. He was involved in the affairs of both the central government and the peripheral provinces. During his first term, he and his sons, Mehmet Beg and Sabit Yusuf Beg, purchased numerous tax farms in Diyarbekir Eyalet, and Kör Yusuf also owned a half-share of the copper refinery in the city of Diyarbekir.

In 1799, Kör Yusuf was assigned command over an Ottoman ground force mobilized at Üsküdar to reassert Ottoman control over Egypt and drive out French forces who occupied that province during the French campaign in the Ottoman Empire. In the initial mobilization, Kör Yusuf's army consisted of 15,000 troops, but after recruiting soldiers from Aleppo and Damascus, the number grew to 25,000 by the time the Ottoman army reached Egypt from its marshaling point in Gaza. Arnauts formed the largest component of Kör Yusuf's forces, and were prone to revolt. Other components included a 5,000-strong cavalry and a contingent of Janissaries.

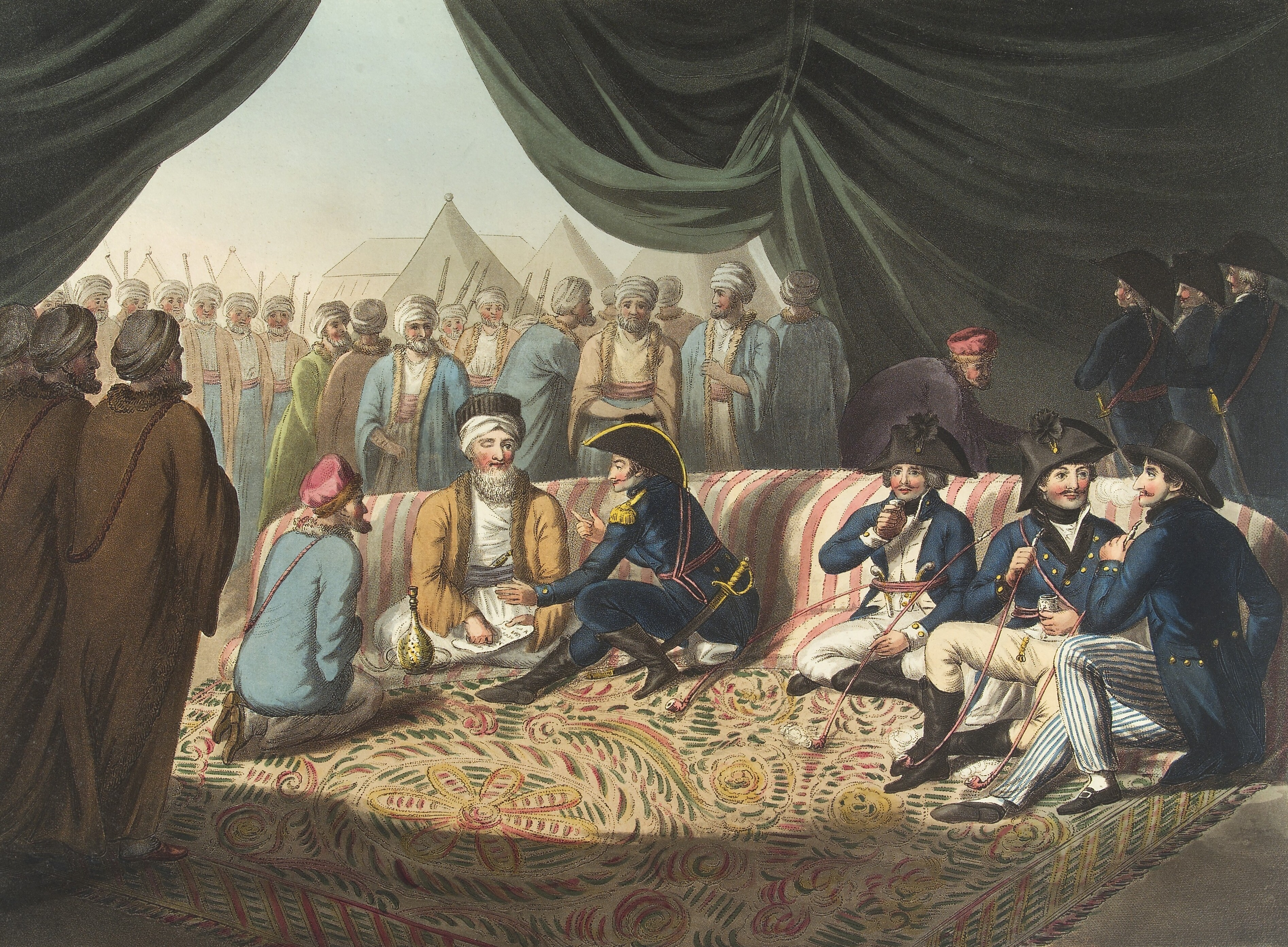
Sydney Smith negotiating with Pasha in his tent on 22 June 1800

In January 1800, Kör Yusuf signed the Convention of al-Arish with French general Jean Baptiste Kléber and British admiral Sidney Smith, which called for the evacuation of French forces from Egypt. However, conflict resumed and Kléber's forces defeated the Ottoman Army and allied Mamluk forces at Heliopolis in March. Kléber was assassinated in mid-June, and after victories by the Ottoman-British alliance, the French were defeated by December 1801.

When Kör Yusuf entered Cairo he had Christians accused of collaborating with the French executed or exiled, and seized large amounts of wealth from them. He remained in Cairo to dispatch the amir al-hajj to command the Hajj pilgrim caravan to Mecca. After sorting some of Egypt's affairs in the aftermath of the French withdrawal, Kör Yusuf departed Egypt for Syria. On 21 April 1805, Kör Yusuf resigned from the office of grand vizier and for a time remained in seclusion in his home.

== Later political career ==
Kör Yusuf was appointed for a second term as governor of Trabzon in March 1807. In September he was appointed the governor of Baghdad and Basra eyalets in Ottoman Iraq, and Konya and Aleppo in October. In 1808 he was appointed a second term as governor of Erzurum and was given the high-ranking post of șark seraskeri (Commander-in-Chief of the East) making him responsible for all of the Ottoman military forces in the Diyarbekir, Sivas, Trabzon, Malatya, Marash, Chorum and Mosul eyalets (provinces). Kör Yusuf performed well against Russian Empire forces at Akhalkalaki.

Kör Yusuf was appointed a second term as grand vizier in 1809 during the sultanate of Mahmud II. During his second term, he led efforts against the Russians in the Rumelian (southern Balkans) front for two years. He was dismissed as grand vizier on 10 May 1811. He was appointed governor of Chios Sanjak in 1817, after having been appointed as commander of Eğriboz Sanjak in 1815. Kör Yusuf died in Chios island in 1819 and was buried at the tomb of Sheikh Ilyas on the island, today a part of Greece.

== See also ==
- List of Ottoman grand viziers

== Bibliography ==
- Aksan, Virginia (2014). Ottoman Wars, 1700–1870: An Empire Besieged. Routledge. ISBN 9781317884033.
- Salzmann, Ariel (2004). Tocqueville in the Ottoman Empire: rival paths to the modern state. Brill. ISBN 9004108874.
