= Battle of Al Khankah =

1801 battle of the French invasion of Egypt and Syria

- Part of the French invasion of Egypt and Syria
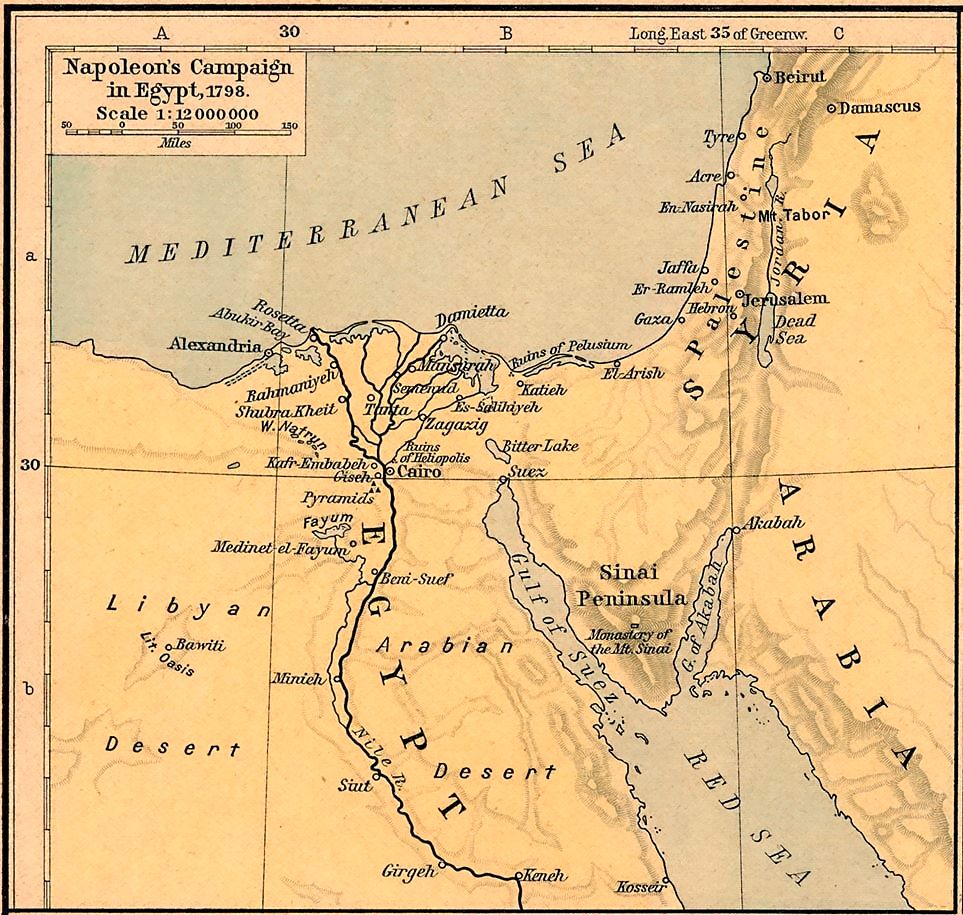
- Map of the French invasion
Date	16 May 1801
Location	Al Khankah, Ottoman Egypt
Result	Ottoman victory

Belligerents
Ottoman Empire	France

Commanders and leaders
Yusuf Pasha; Tahir Pasha; Muhammad Ali	Augustin Daniel Belliard

Strength
9,500	5,500

Casualties and losses
150 killed or wounded	350 killed or wounded

The Battle of Al Khankah was a military engagement between the Ottomans and the French army that took place near Cairo. The Ottomans defeated the French, marking the beginning of the end of the French occupation of Egypt.

== Background ==
As the Ottoman army, led by the Grand Vizier, Yusuf Ziyaüddin Pasha, approached Cairo, the combined armies reached to the other side. The British general, John Hely-Hutchinson, sent a request for the Grand Vizier to halt his march instead of taking a risky engagement with the French; however, Yusuf refused. The French, led by Augustin Daniel Belliard, decided to take out the Ottoman army before the arrival of the British, as they did not have enough men to defend the city. The French army marched out of Cairo with 4,600 infantry, 900 cavalry, and 24 cannons on May 15.

== Battle ==
The French were on reconnaissance. The Ottoman army spotted the French at the springs of Al Khankah. Yusuf then dispatched Tahir Pasha with 3,000 men and 3 guns to attack the French at night. The Ottomans ran into the French, and both sides lay down their arms until the next day. Tahir then attacked the French and was reinforced with 1,500 cavalry and 5,000 Albanians led by Muhammad Ali Pasha. The French took up positions in palm trees, where they exchanged fire with Ottoman sharpshooters for three hours. Belliard attempted to go on offense and formed two large square formations. However, the Ottomans, instructed by British officers, avoided getting close to them, but at the same time, they used their cavalry to combat the enemy sharpshooters. The Bashi-bazouks began swarming around them and firing at a safe distance. Frustrated, Belliard attempted to attack, but the Ottomans swarmed on his flanks. French ammunition and supplies began running out, and more Ottoman reinforcements had come to join the battle. Accepting defeat, Belliard was forced to retreat towards Cairo, and the Ottomans began chasing them for 7 miles before stopping.

== Aftermath ==
The French had suffered 350 killed or wounded, while the Ottomans suffered 150. For the first time, the Ottoman army was able to defeat the French in open battle and settle the campaign. Had the Ottomans lost, Cairo would remain under French control and force Hutchinson to retreat. The battle marked the beginning of the end of the French occupation of Egypt.

== Sources ==
- Reid, Stuart (2021-07-07). Egypt 1801: The End of Napoleon's Eastern Empire. Frontline Books. ISBN 978-1-5267-5847-7.
- The Annual Register: World Events .... 1801. 1801.
