= Second Cairo Revolt =

The Second Cairo Revolt was an uprising by the inhabitants of Cairo against the French Republican occupying forces. It lasted from 20 March to 21 April 1800 and ended when general Jean-Baptiste Kléber was able to position cannon in the Bulaq district and set fire to parts of the city.

== Outbreak ==
Whilst the Ottoman and French forces were fighting, a group from Al-Sadr's army and some Mameluks infiltrated the city and encouraged its inhabitants to revolt. Unlike in the First Cairo Revolt, the merchants and chief sheikhs of the city backed the uprising, paying for supplies. Sayyid Omar Makram, the captain of the Ashraf, and the merchants Ahmed Al-Mahrooqi and Shah Bandar headed a large crowd of the common people of Cairo, as did the Turk Khan Khalili, the Moors living in Egypt, and some of the Mamluks, who were intending the hills outside Bab al-Nasr. In fighting at Rah many Coptic Christians, Swaam and others were killed, and the French entrenched their camp at Azbek.

The Turks had previously brought three cannon, which the rebels brought to Mataria, along with other cannon found buried in princely houses. They also set up a gunpowder factory in Kharnefesh, and they took Beit Al-Qadı and other places "from the direction of the Al-Hussaini scene" to make and repair cannon and ammunition. They set up a prisoner-of-war camp in Jamaliyah and attacked suspected local collaborators.
