= Convention of El Arish =

1800 treaty between France and the Ottoman Empire

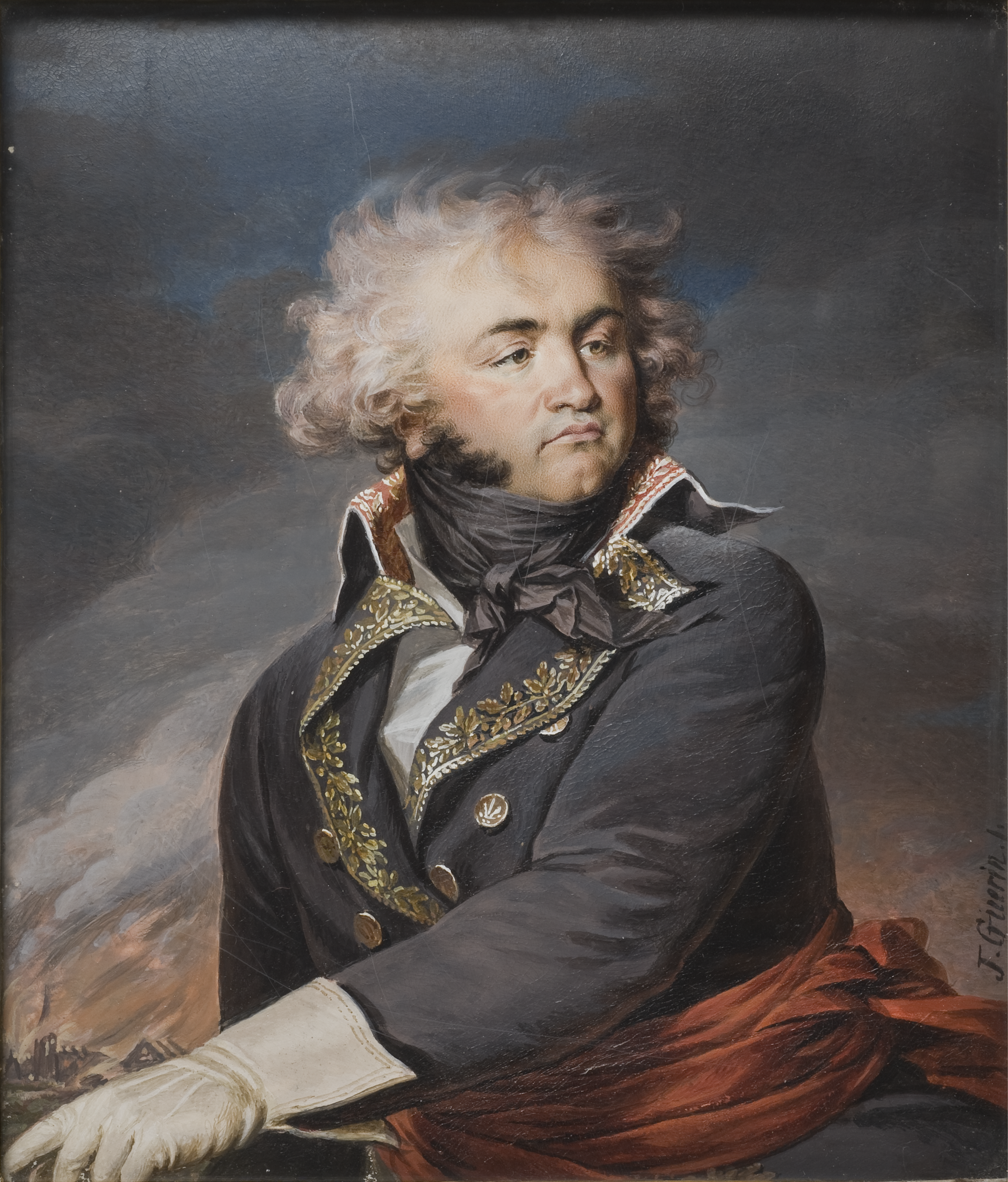
Portrait of Kléber

The Convention of El Arish was signed on 24 January 1800 by representatives from France and the Ottoman Empire in the presence of a British representative. It was intended to bring to an end the French invasion of Egypt and Syria, with the repatriation of French troops to France and the return of all territory to the Ottomans.

In December 1799 the British government had issued orders that its commanders were not to allow a separate treaty to be agreed between the Ottomans and France in which their troops would be returned to Europe. However these instructions did not reach the British naval commander in Egypt, Sidney Smith, until after the convention had been signed. When Smith and his senior officer, Lord Keith, communicated this stipulation to the French forces the French commander Jean-Baptiste Kléber was outraged. He ordered his troops to attack the Ottomans and won the subsequent Battle of Heliopolis on 20 March.

When it heard of the convention the British government agreed to honour it, but it came too late. Hostilities continued until the surrender of French forces at Alexandria in August 1801, after which the French troops were returned to France on board British ships, in accordance with the terms of the original convention.

== Background ==
France invaded the nominally Ottoman-ruled Egypt in 1798 with an army led by Napoleon Bonaparte. Initially successful in taking control of key cities, an expedition to Syria led to defeat and Napoleon returned to France after successfully defeating Ottoman force at the Battle of Abukir in July 1799. Napoleon left command of the French forces in the hands of Jean-Baptiste Kléber. The army was in a poor position, threatened by Ottoman force under Kör Yusuf Ziyaüddin Pasha advancing from Syria and Kléber's troops were near to mutiny following their abandonment by Napoleon.

== Convention ==
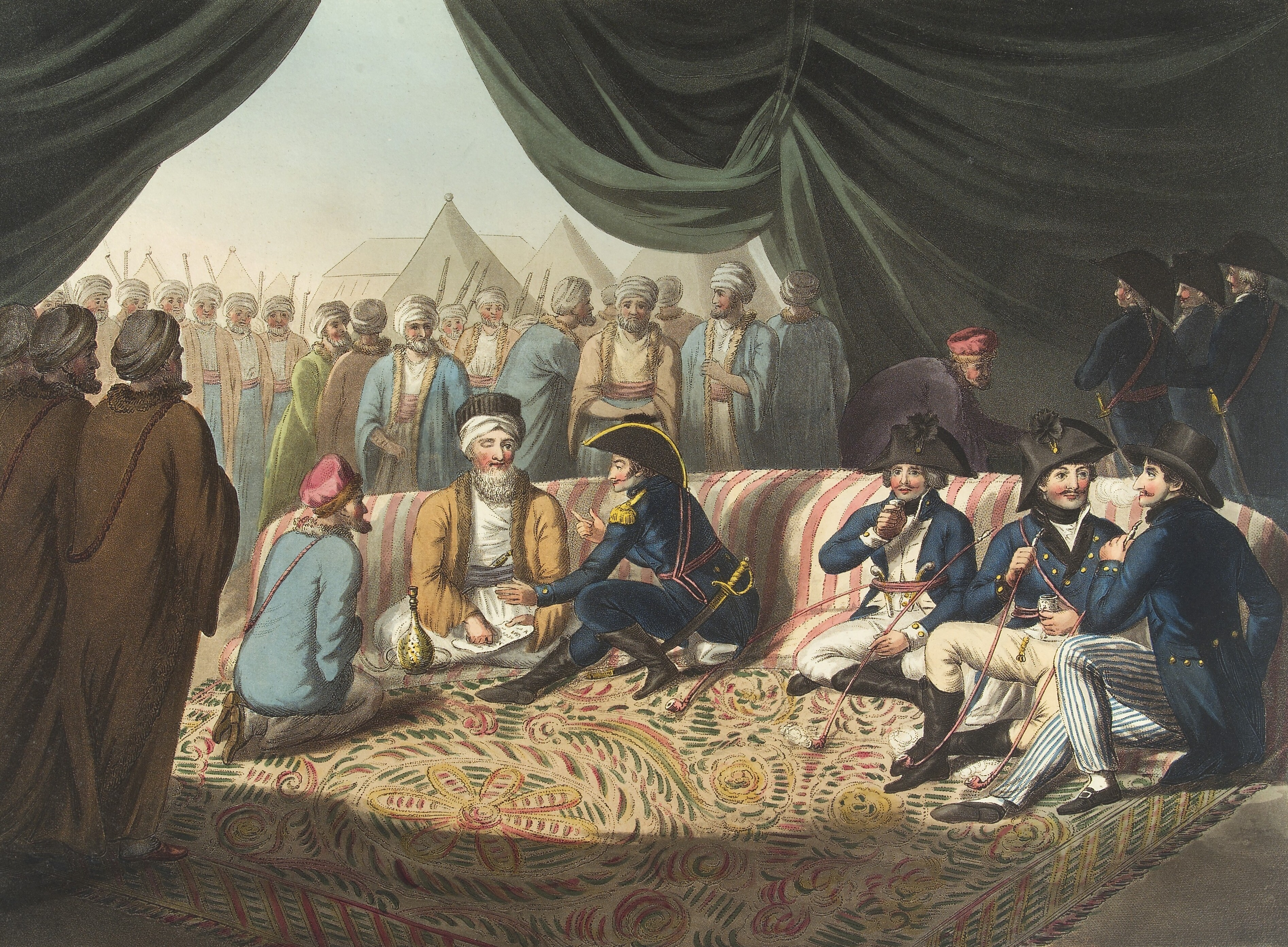
Smith negotiating with Pasha in the latter's tent, 22 June 1800

Kléber made contact with the commander of local British naval forces, Commodore Sidney Smith, with regards to entering peace negotiations. It has since been disputed by historians as to whether either man had the necessary authority to carry out the negotiations and to agree any compromises, but with their governments being two months travel away it seems that a pragmatic approach was taken and negotiations began via letter. Kléber stated that any peace would be contingent on his men being allowed to leave Egypt on board Ottoman ships with all their baggage and weapons. He demanded safe passage from attack by Ottoman forces, a dissolution of the alliance of the Ottoman Empire with Britain and Russia and for the Ottoman Empire to pay the costs of feeding and lodging French forces until they could be evacuated. Kléber also wanted an immediate halt to all offensive action and movement of Ottoman forces, an action that Yusuf refused to agree to.

The 250-strong French garrison at El Arish mutinied and opened the town to occupation by Ottoman forces. The Ottomans began a massacre of the French troops until halted by their British liaison officer. Shortly afterwards Smith, Yusuf and two of Kléber's officers met in the town to open negotiations. Yusuf stated that he would provide safe passage and transport back to France but was not willing to meet the remaining requests. Kléber then dropped his requirement for a halt to the movement of Ottoman forces and conceded that the alliance between the Ottomans and Russia and Britain could remain in place until a formal peace treaty could be agreed. Kléber insisted that the Ottoman Empire needed to pay for the upkeep and provisions of the French troops until the evacuation could be agreed. Yusuf agreed to the revised terms and signed the convention on 24 January 1800. Smith did not sign the document.

== Aftermath and repudiation ==
Kléber personally ratified a copy of the convention on 26 January and copies signed by Yusef and Kléber were formally exchanged on 30 January. French garrisons were withdrawn to Alexandria, Aboukir and Rosetta to await transport. However Smith's commander Lord Keith had received orders from London, dated 15 December 1799, that he was not to allow any separate treaties to be agreed between the Ottomans and France nor "to consent to any capitulation with the French troops at least unless they lay down their arms, surrender themselves prisoners of war, and deliver up all the ships and stores of the port of Alexandria to the Allied Powers". He was further ordered to intercept any ships carrying out an evacuation of French troops from Egypt. Keith sent a letter conveying this information to Smith from his headquarters at Minorca on 8 January but this did not reach him until after the convention was signed.

Smith communicated that the convention, as it was agreed only between the Ottomans and France, was invalid in a letter of 21 February but stated that he was hopeful that the British government would reconsider upon reading the details of the convention. Keith, when he heard the details was supportive of the convention but also sent a letter to Kléber with details of his orders that demanded nothing less than an unconditional surrender. This letter reached Kléber at Cairo on 18 March, by which time Yusef had moved an army of 40,000 men to nearby Heliopolis. Kléber was outraged and led his troops against Yusuf. He inflicted a heavy defeat upon the Ottoman forces in the 20 March Battle of Heliopolis.

Kléber was assassinated in Cairo on 14 June by Suleiman al-Halabi, a Syrian student supportive of the Ottoman cause. Kléber's successor was General Jacques-François Menou. In the meantime the British government, led by William Pitt the Younger, had received a copy of the convention and agreed to its acceptance. However a British envoy, Lieutenant Wright of HMS Tigre, did not reach the French troops until 22 August at which point he was refused admission to Alexandria - General Menou being optimistic of French fortunes in a renewed campaign. Wright endeavoured to communicate the acceptance to the French rank and file and induce them to revolt against their generals who refused to allow them to go home, but was turned away. Upon hearing of this rejection the British government decided upon a fresh offensive to evict the French from Egypt. This was successfully carried out resulting in the surrender of French forces at Alexandria in August 1801 and the subsequent repatriation of French troops on British ships.

== British parliamentary debates ==
The British government's actions in regards the convention were criticised in the House of Commons by MP Thomas Tyrwhitt Jones. He put forward a motion on 2 June 1801 to discover who had initially ordered that no treaty was to be agreed to. Jones praised Smith's actions and stated that the requirement of keeping British troops tied up in Egypt to fight the French may have caused the loss of Hanover to the forces of the Second League of Armed Neutrality in April 1801; the loss of Portugal to Franco-Spanish forces during the War of the Oranges in June 1801; and severely weakened the defences of the British Isles. Jones' opponents said that he had unsuccessfully raised the issue on no fewer than 12 occasions and his latest motion was defeated by 138 votes to 22.
