= Alissas =

- Commune
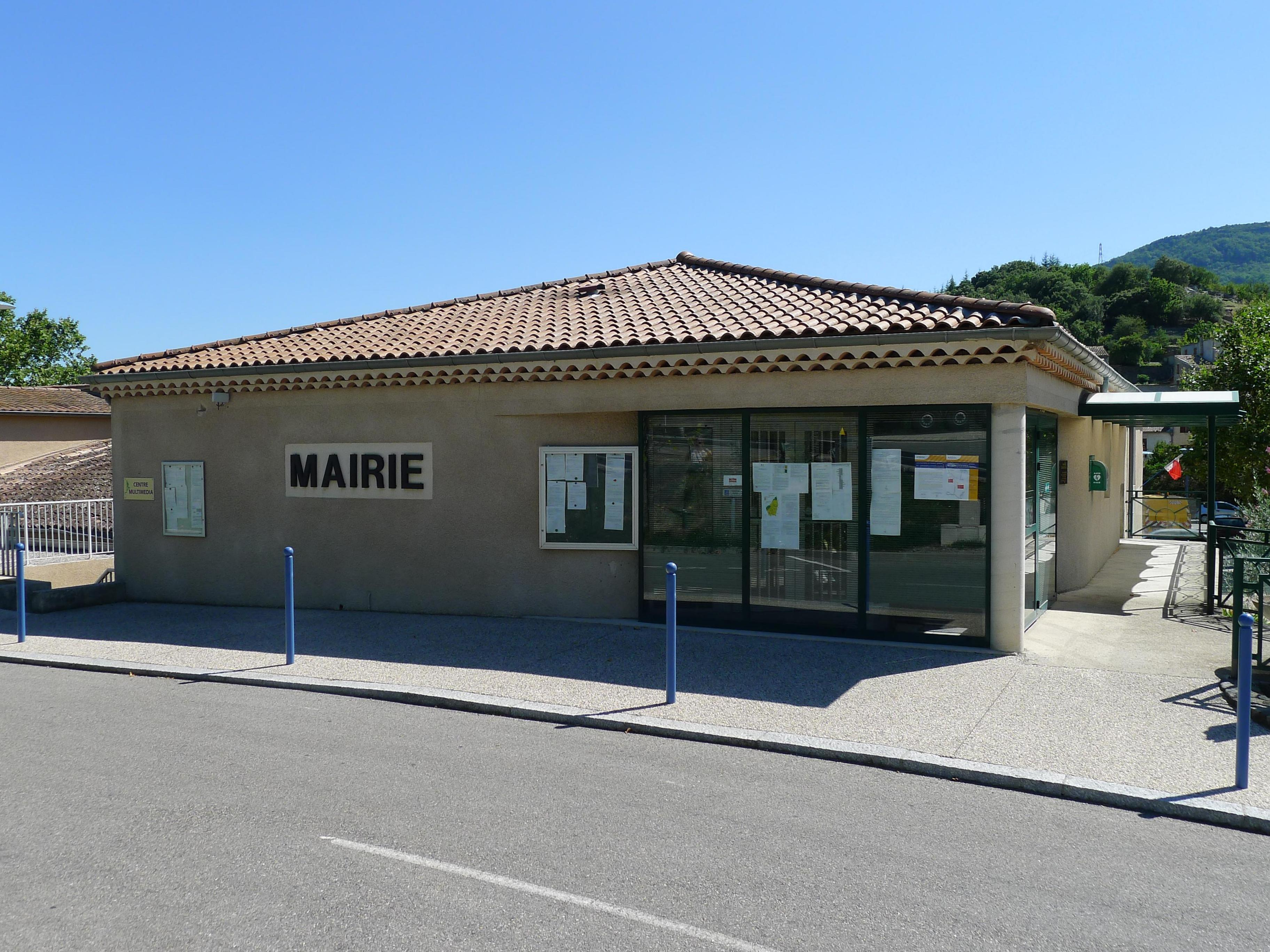
- Town hall
- Location of Alissas
- Location within France Location within Auvergne-Rhône-Alpes
- Coordinates: 44°42′49″N 4°37′52″E
- Country: France
- Region: Auvergne-Rhône-Alpes
- Department: Ardèche
- Arrondissement: Privas
- Canton: Privas
- Intercommunality: CA Privas Centre Ardèche

Government
  - Mayor (2020–2026): Jérôme Bernard
- Area^{1}: 12.43 km^{2} (4.80 sq mi)
- Elevation: 229 m (751 ft)
- Highest elevation: 789 m (2,589 ft)
- Lowest elevation: 196 m (643 ft)
- Population (2023): 1,519
  - Density: 122.2/km^{2} (316.5/sq mi)
- Time zone: UTC+01:00 (CET)
  - Summer (DST): UTC+02:00 (CEST)
- INSEE/Postal code: 07008 /07210
- ^{1} French Land Register data, which excludes lakes, ponds, glaciers > 1 km^{2} (0.386 sq mi or 247 acres) and river estuaries.

Alissas (French pronunciation: [alisas]; Occitan: Alissaç) is a commune in the Ardèche department in the Auvergne-Rhône-Alpes region of southern France.

== Geography ==
Alissas is located some 45 km south-west of Valence and 5 km south-east of Privas. It can be accessed by the D2 road from Privas, which passes through the commune and village and continues to Chomérac in the east. The D299 road also goes south from the village to Rochessauve. Most of the commune to the south-west and north is heavily forested, with areas of farmland in the south-east.

The Ruisseau de Combier forms much of the western border before turning east and passing through the village. It then flows east, collecting many tributaries until it reaches the Rhone north of Baix. Many tributaries rise in the commune and join the Combier including the Ruisseau de Fontgrand from the north, the Gounier from the south-west, and the Ruisseau de Bouzarin from the south-east.

== History ==
The ancient village of Alissas is called Alissacio in Occitan and dates back to the 13th century with the first known traces dated in current sources from 1281. Like all other towns and villages it was not spared during the wars of religion. It was sacked, pillaged, and burned many times by garrison troops from all sides. Its church was even sacked in the 16th century. In the 17th and 18th centuries Alissas had tanneries, gristmills, and plantations of mulberry trees that were greatly developed with silkworms since they are their favorite food. On 1 March 1862 the village was traversed by a railway line passing just above the old town and its walls. This line connected Le Pouzin to Privas and there was a station at Alissas. The railway crossed the village passing over a viaduct built especially for this line, which was also the largest viaduct on the line. In figures the viaduct was 178m long with 12 arches, 11 columns, 2 abutments and a height of 18.60m. During World War II the Maquis blew up the two arches closest to Privas to prevent German trains from running. It was rebuilt with the work completed 28 days after the end of the war on 30 September 1945. The line was closed down on 8 October 1950 for passenger traffic but continued to carry freight trains until 31 May 1994. Several years before this abandonment, however, the commune mobilized to protect its heritage status. There is a landscaped pedestrian path along all of the line. Today there are still some who envisage the reopening of the line.

== Administration ==
List of Successive Mayors

| From | To | Name | Party |
|---|---|---|---|
| 2001 | 2014 | Jean Leynaud | DVD |
| 2014 | Current | Jérôme Bernard | DVD |

== Population ==
The inhabitants of the commune are known as Alissains or Alissaines in French.

Historical population
| Year | Pop. | ±% p.a. |
|---|---|---|
| 1968 | 508 | — |
| 1975 | 478 | −0.87% |
| 1982 | 618 | +3.74% |
| 1990 | 720 | +1.93% |
| 1999 | 1,026 | +4.01% |
| 2007 | 1,230 | +2.29% |
| 2012 | 1,416 | +2.86% |
| 2017 | 1,479 | +0.87% |
| 2023 | 1,519 | +0.45% |
Source: INSEE

== See also ==
- Communes of the Ardèche department
- Cantons of the Ardèche department
- Arrondissements of the Ardèche department
