= Saint-Symphorien-sous-Chomérac =

- Commune
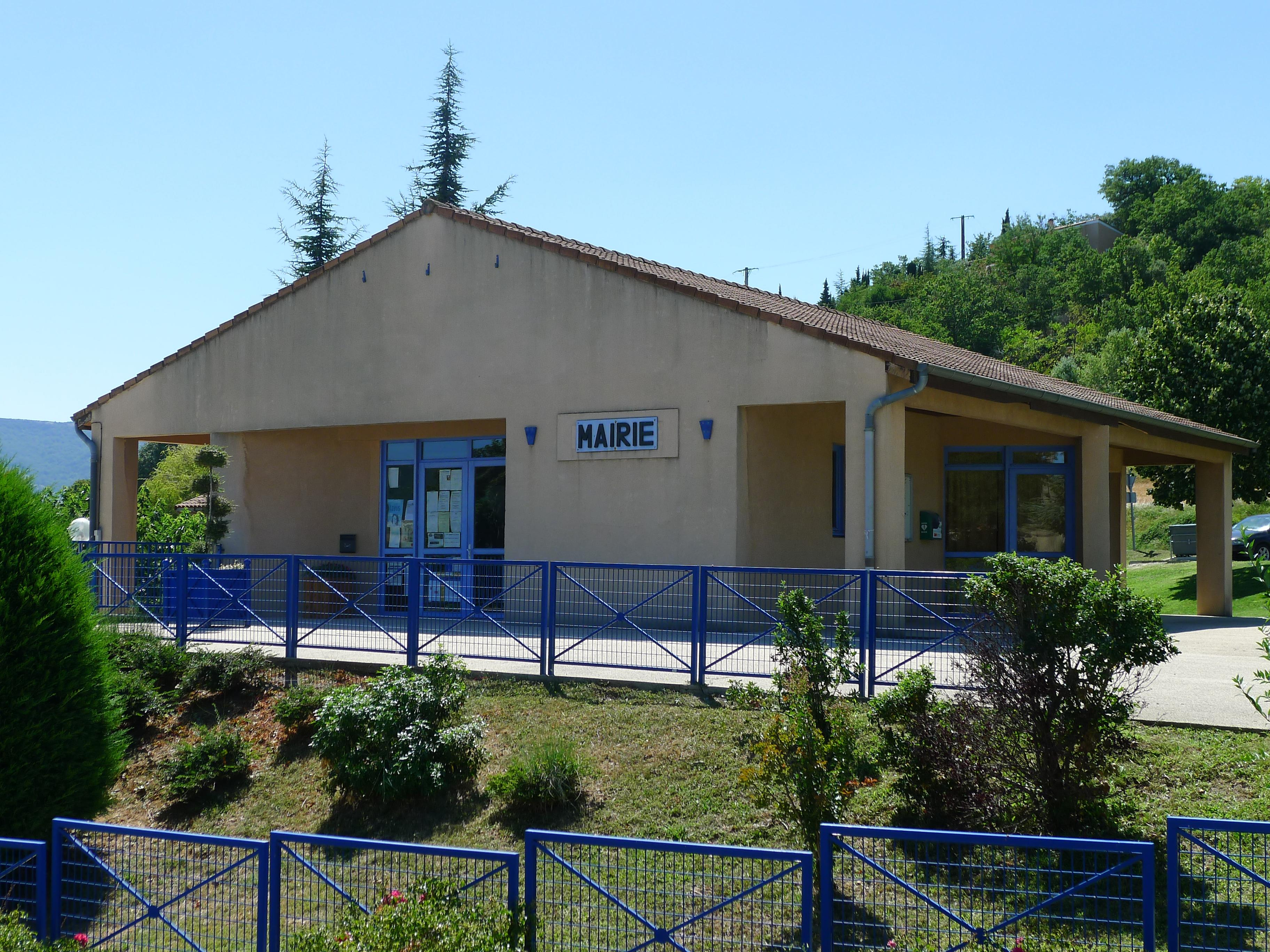
- Town hall
- Location of Saint-Symphorien-sous-Chomérac
- Location within France Location within Auvergne-Rhône-Alpes
- Coordinates: 44°43′13″N 4°42′18″E
- Country: France
- Region: Auvergne-Rhône-Alpes
- Department: Ardèche
- Arrondissement: Privas
- Canton: Le Pouzin

Government
  - Mayor (2020–2026): Dominique Palix
- Area^{1}: 7.86 km^{2} (3.03 sq mi)
- Elevation: 200 m (660 ft)
- Highest elevation: 394 m (1,293 ft)
- Lowest elevation: 110 m (360 ft)
- Population (2023): 887
  - Density: 113/km^{2} (292/sq mi)
- Time zone: UTC+01:00 (CET)
  - Summer (DST): UTC+02:00 (CEST)
- INSEE/Postal code: 07298 /07210
- ^{1} French Land Register data, which excludes lakes, ponds, glaciers > 1 km^{2} (0.386 sq mi or 247 acres) and river estuaries.

Saint-Symphorien-sous-Chomérac (French pronunciation: [sɛ̃ sɛ̃fɔʁjɛ̃ su ʃɔmeʁak], literally Saint-Symphorien under Chomérac; Occitan: Sant Sinforian de Chomerac) is a commune in the Ardèche department in southern France.

== Population ==
Historical population
| Year | Pop. | ±% p.a. |
|---|---|---|
| 1968 | 246 | — |
| 1975 | 247 | +0.06% |
| 1982 | 381 | +6.39% |
| 1990 | 519 | +3.94% |
| 1999 | 684 | +3.11% |
| 2007 | 716 | +0.57% |
| 2012 | 730 | +0.39% |
| 2017 | 757 | +0.73% |
| 2023 | 887 | +2.68% |
Source: INSEE

== See also ==
- Communes of the Ardèche department
