= Arrondissement of Privas =

Coordinates: 44°43′55″N 4°35′53″E

Privas
- Arrondissement
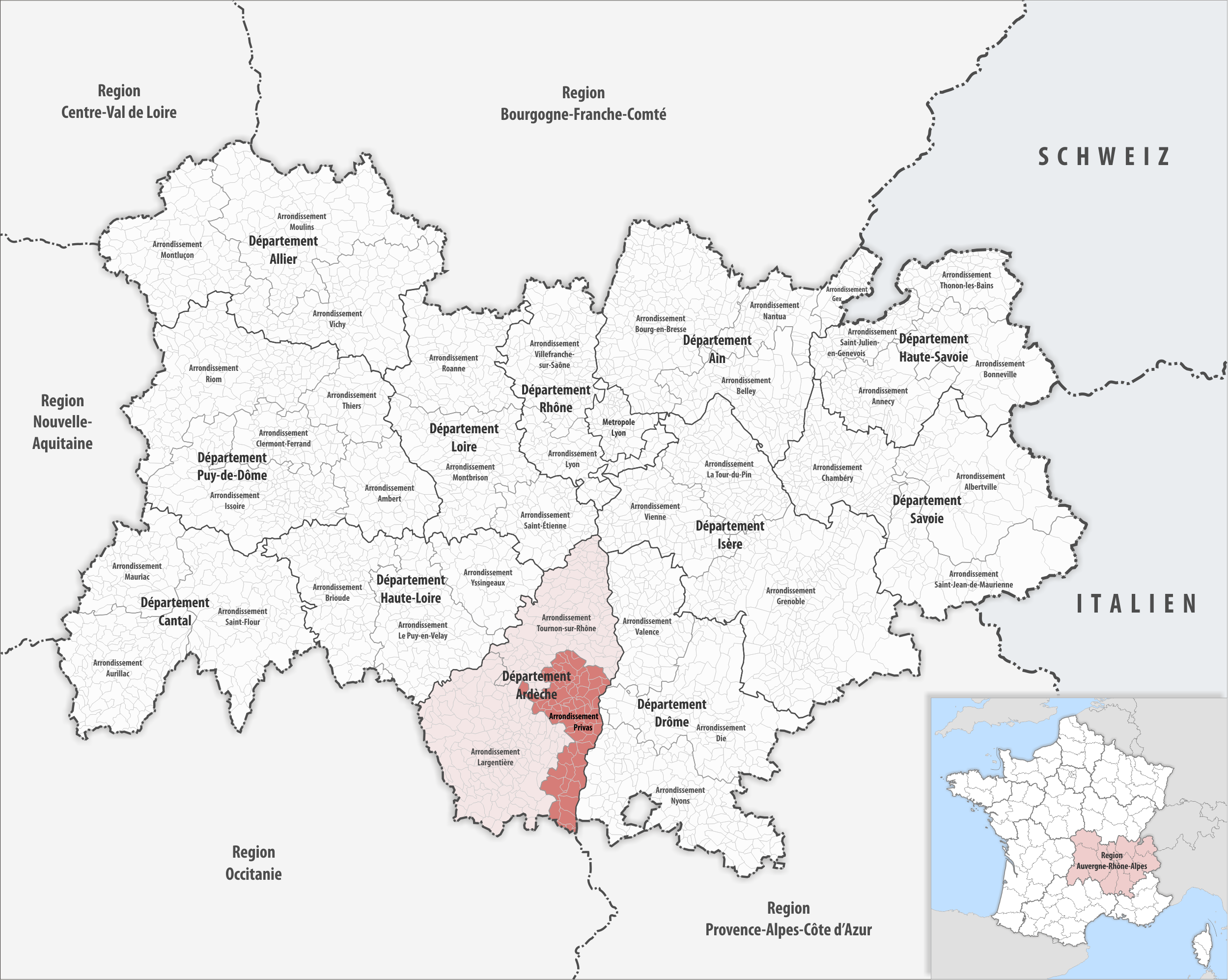
- Location within the region Auvergne-Rhône-Alpes
- Country: France
- Region: Auvergne-Rhône-Alpes
- Department: Ardèche
- No. of communes: {{{nbcomm}}}
- Area: 1,145.5 km^{2} (442.3 sq mi)
- Population (2023): 86,594
  - Density: 75.595/km^{2} (195.79/sq mi)
- INSEE code: 072

The arrondissement of Privas is an arrondissement of France in the Ardèche department in the Auvergne-Rhône-Alpes region. It has 66 communes. Its population is 86,154 (2021), and its area is 1,145.5 km^{2} (442.3 sq mi).

== Composition ==
The communes of the arrondissement of Privas are:

1. Ajoux
2. Alba-la-Romaine
3. Alissas
4. Aubignas
5. Baix
6. Beauchastel
7. Beauvène
8. Bidon
9. Bourg-Saint-Andéol
10. Chalencon
11. Châteauneuf-de-Vernoux
12. Chomérac
13. Coux
14. Creysseilles
15. Cruas
16. Dunière-sur-Eyrieux
17. Flaviac
18. Freyssenet
19. Gilhac-et-Bruzac
20. Gluiras
21. Gourdon
22. Gras
23. Larnas
24. Lyas
25. Marcols-les-Eaux
26. Meysse
27. Les Ollières-sur-Eyrieux
28. Pourchères
29. Le Pouzin
30. Pranles
31. Privas
32. Rochemaure
33. Rochessauve
34. Rompon
35. Saint-Apollinaire-de-Rias
36. Saint-Bauzile
37. Saint-Cierge-la-Serre
38. Saint-Étienne-de-Serre
39. Saint-Fortunat-sur-Eyrieux
40. Saint-Jean-Chambre
41. Saint-Julien-du-Gua
42. Saint-Julien-en-Saint-Alban
43. Saint-Julien-le-Roux
44. Saint-Just-d'Ardèche
45. Saint-Lager-Bressac
46. Saint-Laurent-du-Pape
47. Saint-Marcel-d'Ardèche
48. Saint-Martin-d'Ardèche
49. Saint-Martin-sur-Lavezon
50. Saint-Maurice-en-Chalencon
51. Saint-Michel-de-Chabrillanoux
52. Saint-Montan
53. Saint-Pierre-la-Roche
54. Saint-Priest
55. Saint-Sauveur-de-Montagut
56. Saint-Symphorien-sous-Chomérac
57. Saint-Thomé
58. Saint-Vincent-de-Barrès
59. Saint-Vincent-de-Durfort
60. Silhac
61. Le Teil
62. Valvignères
63. Vernoux-en-Vivarais
64. Veyras
65. Viviers
66. La Voulte-sur-Rhône

== History ==
The arrondissement of Privas was created in 1800. In 2007 it lost the four cantons of Antraigues-sur-Volane, Aubenas, Vals-les-Bains and Villeneuve-de-Berg to the arrondissement of Largentière. At the January 2017 reorganization of the arrondissements of Ardèche, it gained eight communes from the arrondissement of Tournon-sur-Rhône and it lost five communes to the arrondissement of Tournon-sur-Rhône and two communes to the arrondissement of Largentière.

As a result of the reorganisation of the cantons of France which came into effect in 2015, the borders of the cantons are no longer related to the borders of the arrondissements. The cantons of the arrondissement of Privas were, as of January 2015:

1. Bourg-Saint-Andéol
2. Chomérac
3. Privas
4. Rochemaure
5. Saint-Pierreville
6. Viviers
7. La Voulte-sur-Rhône
