= Gourdon =

Gourdon may refer to:

== Places ==
In France

- Arrondissement of Gourdon, in Lot, France
- Gare de Gourdon, a railway station in Gourdon, Midi-Pyrénées
- Gourdon, Alpes-Maritimes, a commune in Alpes-Maritimes
- Gourdon, Ardèche, a commune in Ardèche
- Gourdon, Lot, a commune in Lot
- Gourdon, Saône-et-Loire, a commune in Saône-et-Loire
- Gourdon-Murat, a commune in Corrèze

In Scotland

- Gourdon, Aberdeenshire, a village in Aberdeenshire

In Antarctica

- Gourdon Glacier, James Ross Island
- Gourdon Peak, Booth Island
- Gourdon Peninsula, Anvers Island

== People with the surname ==
- Jean-François Gourdon (born 1954), French rugby union player
- Kevin Gourdon (born 1990), French rugby union player

== See also ==
- Gordon (disambiguation)
