= Veyras =

Veyras may refer to:

- Veyras, Switzerland, a municipality in the canton of Valais
- Veyras, Ardèche, a commune in France
