= Ajoux =

- Commune
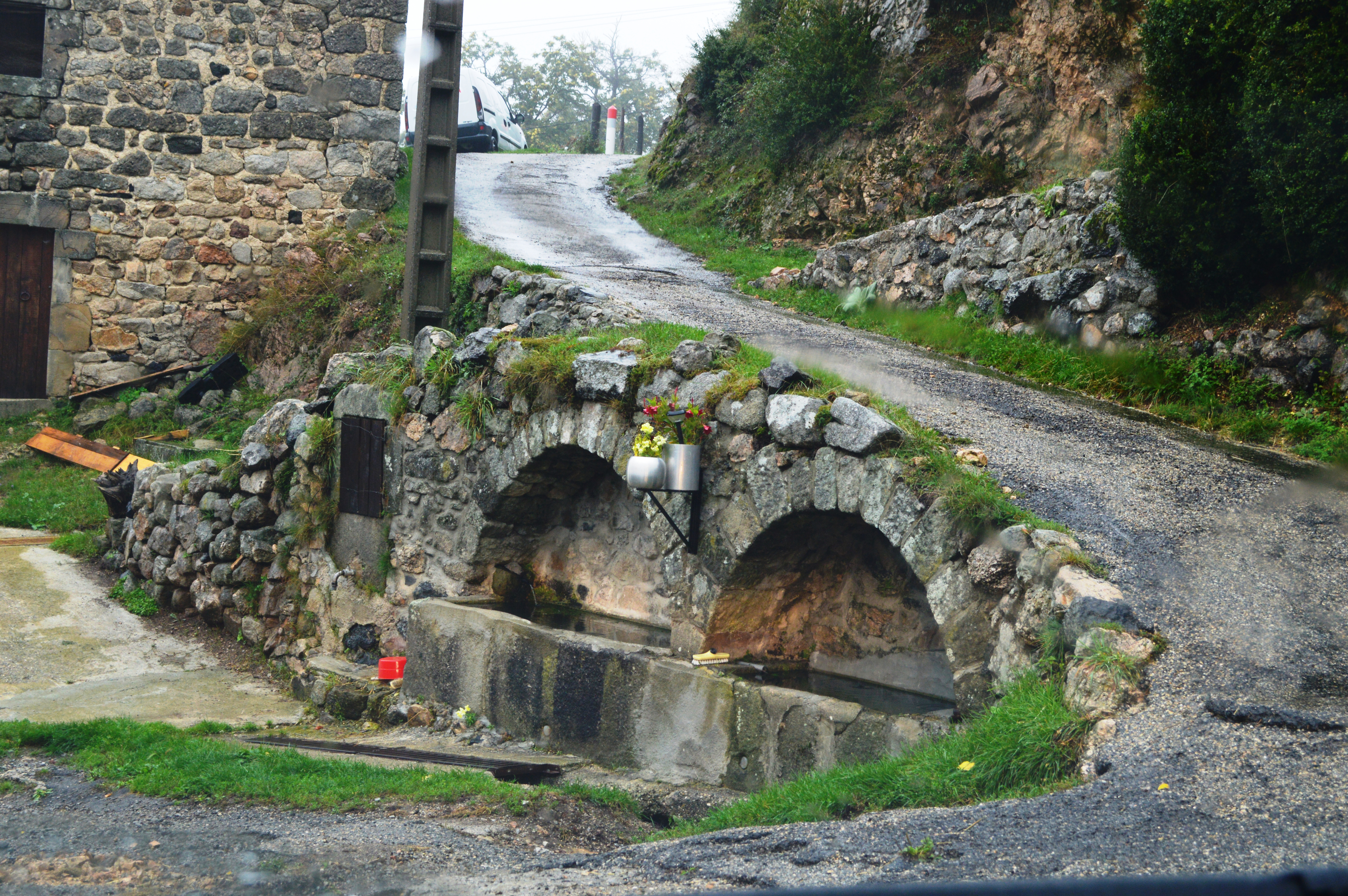
- Ajoux Water Troughs
- Location of Ajoux
- Location within France Location within Auvergne-Rhône-Alpes
- Coordinates: 44°45′27″N 4°29′39″E
- Country: France
- Region: Auvergne-Rhône-Alpes
- Department: Ardèche
- Arrondissement: Privas
- Canton: Privas
- Intercommunality: CA Privas Centre Ardèche

Government
  - Mayor (2020–2026): Adrien Feougier
- Area^{1}: 12.2 km^{2} (4.7 sq mi)
- Elevation: 750 m (2,460 ft)
- Highest elevation: 1,068 m (3,504 ft)
- Lowest elevation: 393 m (1,289 ft)
- Population (2023): 81
  - Density: 6.6/km^{2} (17/sq mi)
- Time zone: UTC+01:00 (CET)
  - Summer (DST): UTC+02:00 (CEST)
- INSEE/Postal code: 07004 /07000
- ^{1} French Land Register data, which excludes lakes, ponds, glaciers > 1 km^{2} (0.386 sq mi or 247 acres) and river estuaries.

Ajoux (French pronunciation: [aʒu]) is a commune in the Ardèche department in the Auvergne-Rhône-Alpes region of southern France.

== Geography ==
Ajoux is located some 100 km south by south east of Lyon and 100 km north by north-east of Avignon. The south of the commune is traversed by the D122 road which runs west from the D104 in a circuitous route through the commune then north-west to Mezilhac. It is possible to access the hamlet of Blaizac from this road via small mountain roads. The D361 runs off this road to the north through the commune to Ajoux village. It continues through the village to join the D244 within the commune. The D244 links La Pervenche in the north-west by a circuitous route through the commune and continues east passing near the hamlet of Mauves and joining the D344 near Pranles. The D261 follows the Auzene next to the northern border but does not link to the commune.

In addition to Ajoux, there are only the small hamlets of Blaizac and Mauves.

The northern border of the commune is delineated by the Auzene river and many streams flow from the commune north to join this river including the Auzener which forms the western border of the commune. The Auzene with many more tributaries downstream eventually joins the Eyneux river which eventually joins the Rhone at La Voulte-sur-Rhône.

The commune appears mountainous with forests and wasteland. There are two quarries but no farming.

== Administration ==
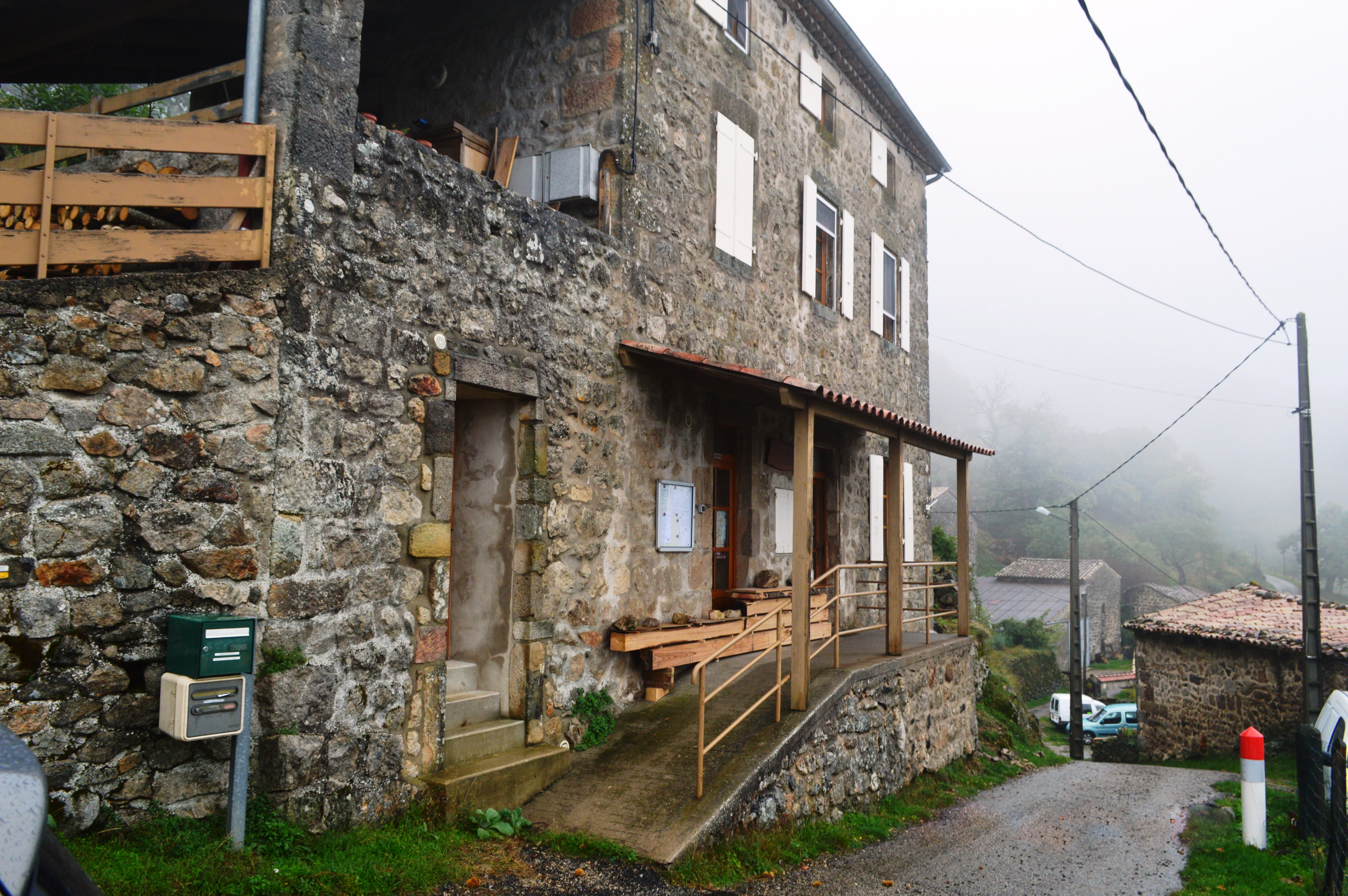
The Town Hall

=== List of successive mayors of Ajoux ===
From	To	Name	Party
2001	2008	Pascal Dumoulin	
2008	2020	Annick Rybus	DVG
2020	Current	Adrien Feougier	

== Population ==
The inhabitants of the commune are known as Ajouxois or Ajouxoises in French.

Historical population
Year	Pop.	±% p.a.
1968	115	—
1975	90	−3.44%
1982	79	−1.85%
1990	71	−1.33%
1999	89	+2.54%
2007	94	+0.69%
2012	94	+0.00%
2017	77	−3.91%
2023	81	+0.85%
Source: INSEE

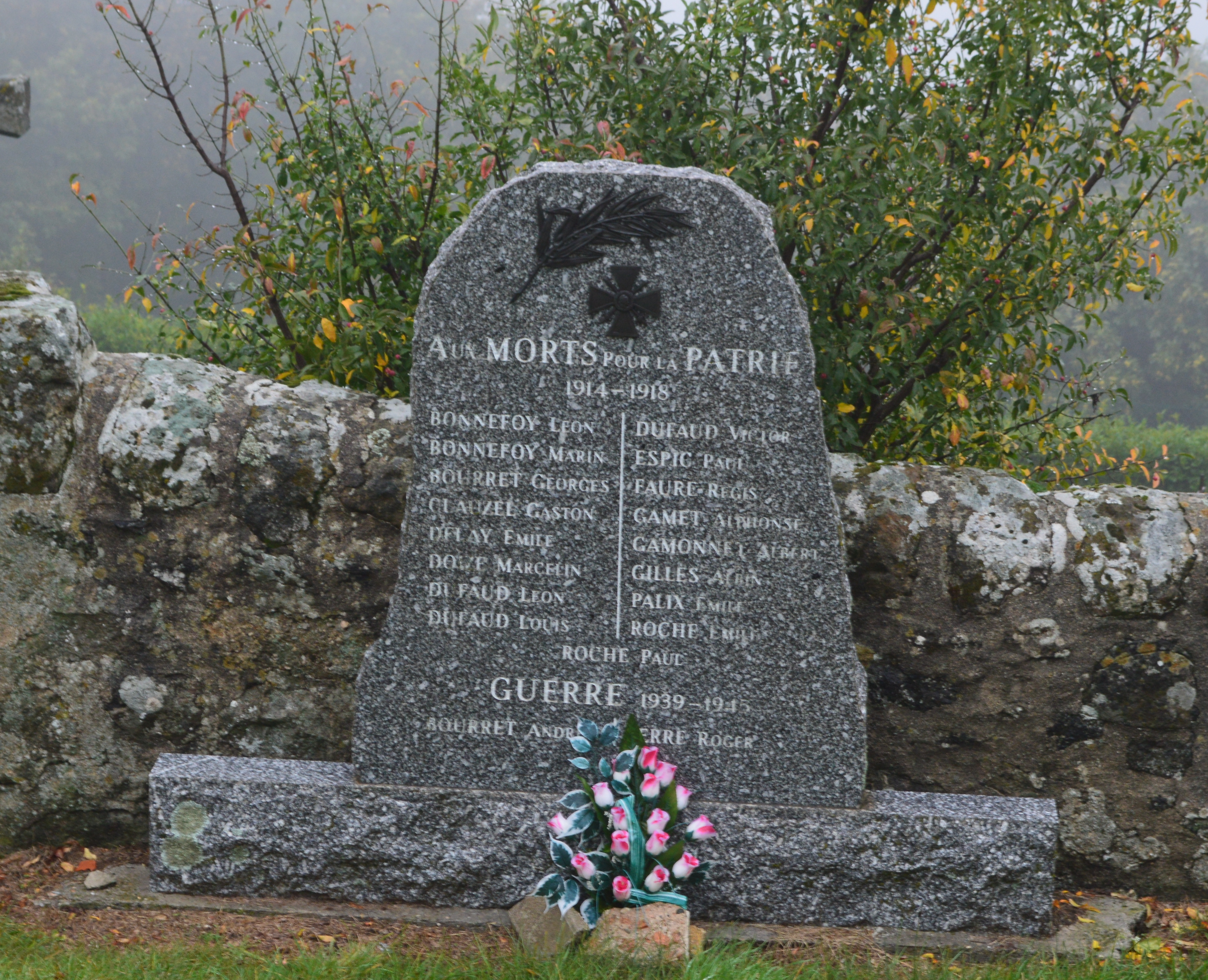
Ajoux War Memorial

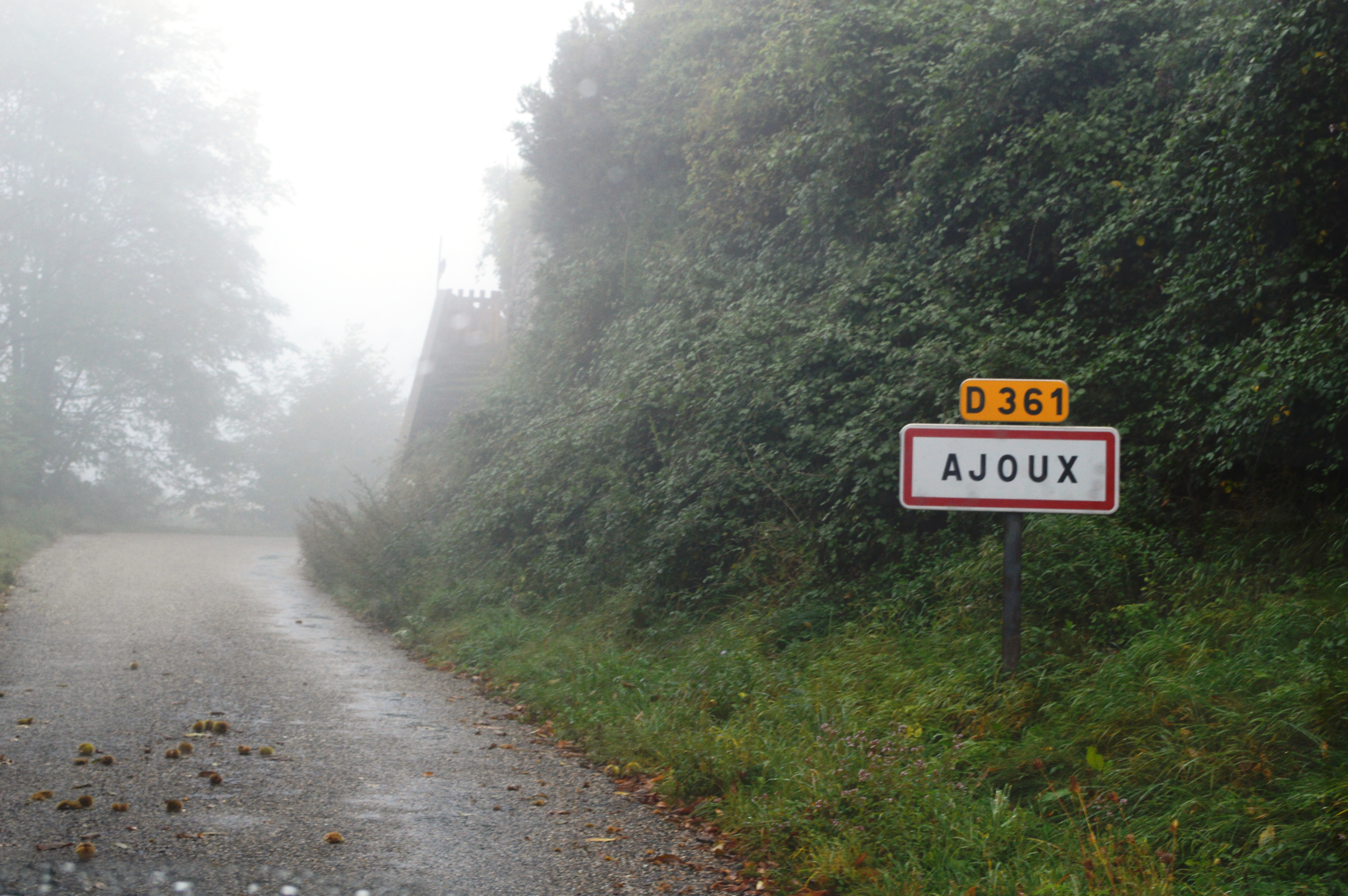
The entry to Ajoux

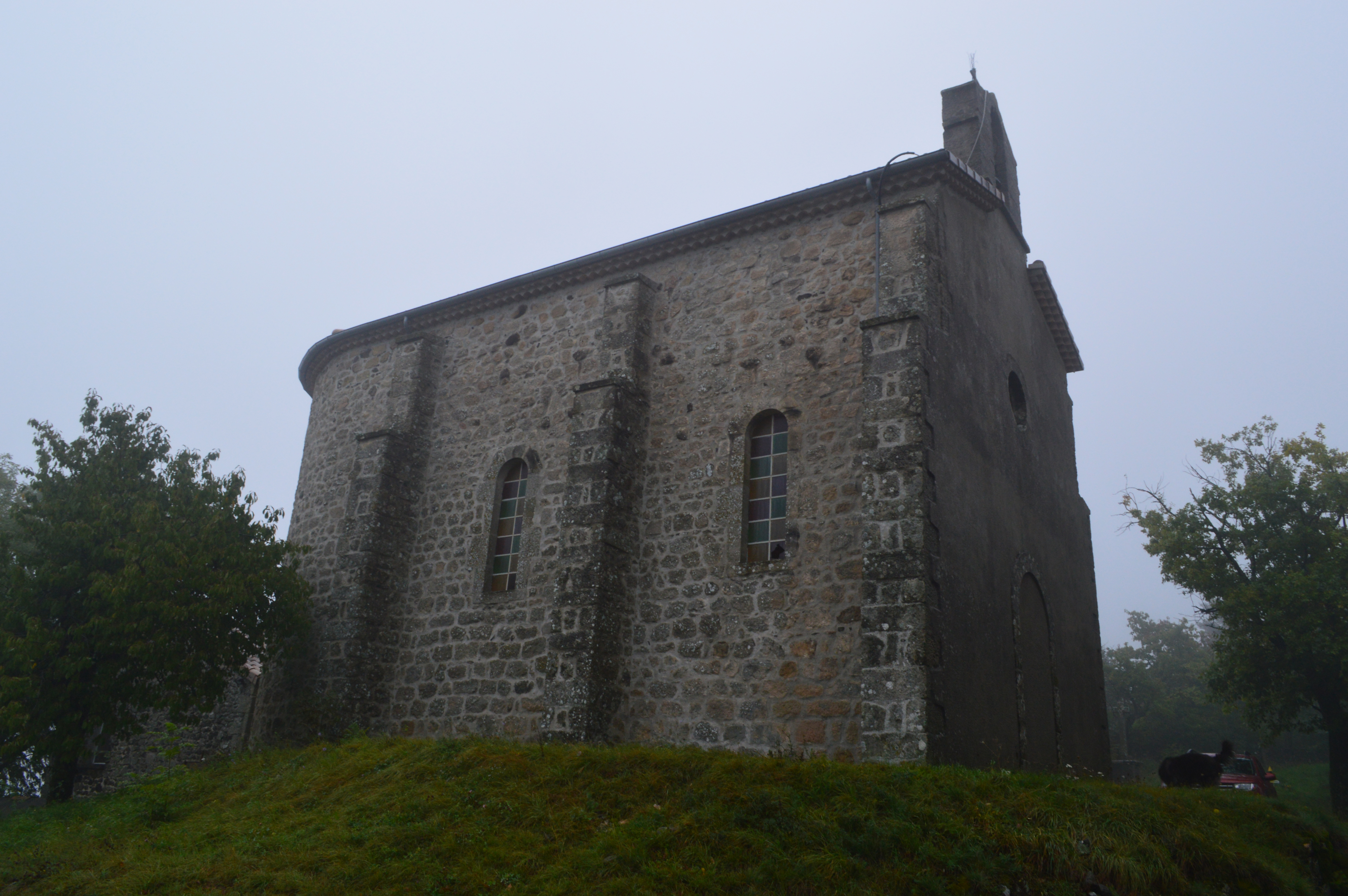
Ajoux Church

== Sites and monuments ==
The best known is the Ajoux Rock.

(Not to be confused with the Roche d'Ajoux in the Rhône department)

== See also ==
- Communes of the Ardèche department
