= Saint-Maurice-en-Chalencon =

- Commune
- Location of Saint-Maurice-en-Chalencon
- Location within France Location within Auvergne-Rhône-Alpes
- Coordinates: 44°51′35″N 4°35′24″E
- Country: France
- Region: Auvergne-Rhône-Alpes
- Department: Ardèche
- Arrondissement: Privas
- Canton: Haut-Eyrieux
- Intercommunality: CA Privas Centre Ardèche

Government
  - Mayor (2020–2026): Ghislaine Chambon
- Area^{1}: 7.81 km^{2} (3.02 sq mi)
- Elevation: 550 m (1,800 ft)
- Highest elevation: 727 m (2,385 ft)
- Lowest elevation: 219 m (719 ft)
- Population (2023): 203
  - Density: 26.0/km^{2} (67.3/sq mi)
- Time zone: UTC+01:00 (CET)
  - Summer (DST): UTC+02:00 (CEST)
- INSEE/Postal code: 07274 /07190
- ^{1} French Land Register data, which excludes lakes, ponds, glaciers > 1 km^{2} (0.386 sq mi or 247 acres) and river estuaries.

Saint-Maurice-en-Chalencon (French: [sɛ̃ mɔʁis ɑ̃ ʃalɑ̃kɔ̃]; Occitan: Sant Maurici de Chalencon) is a commune in the Ardèche department in southern France.

== Population ==
Historical population
Year	Pop.	±% p.a.
1968	268	—
1975	206	−3.69%
1982	163	−3.29%
1990	161	−0.15%
1999	181	+1.31%
2007	176	−0.35%
2012	205	+3.10%
2017	220	+1.42%
2023	203	−1.33%
Source: INSEE

== See also ==
- Communes of the Ardèche department
