= Saint-Cierge-la-Serre =

- Commune
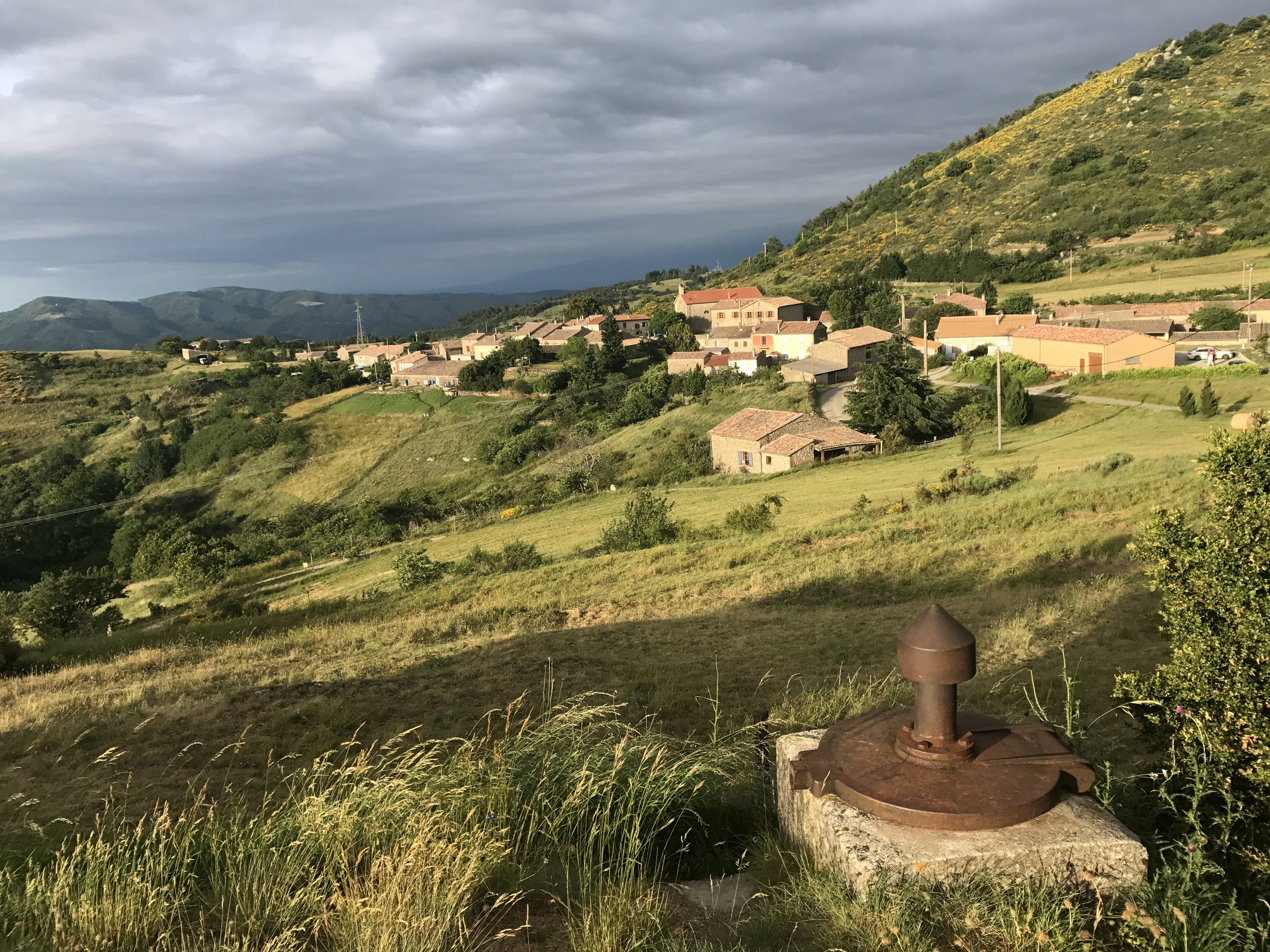
- Location of Saint-Cierge-la-Serre
- Location within France Location within Auvergne-Rhône-Alpes
- Coordinates: 44°47′39″N 4°41′14″E
- Country: France
- Region: Auvergne-Rhône-Alpes
- Department: Ardèche
- Arrondissement: Privas
- Canton: La Voulte-sur-Rhône
- Intercommunality: CA Privas Centre Ardèche

Government
  - Mayor (2020–2026): Olivier Naudot
- Area^{1}: 16.2 km^{2} (6.3 sq mi)
- Elevation: 520 m (1,710 ft)
- Highest elevation: 829 m (2,720 ft)
- Lowest elevation: 179 m (587 ft)
- Population (2023): 243
  - Density: 15.0/km^{2} (38.8/sq mi)
- Time zone: UTC+01:00 (CET)
  - Summer (DST): UTC+02:00 (CEST)
- INSEE/Postal code: 07221 /07800
- ^{1} French Land Register data, which excludes lakes, ponds, glaciers > 1 km^{2} (0.386 sq mi or 247 acres) and river estuaries.

Saint-Cierge-la-Serre (French pronunciation: [sɛ̃ sjɛʁʒ la sɛʁ]; Occitan: Sant Cierge la Serre) is a commune in the Ardèche department in the Rhône Valley in southern France.

== Population ==
Historical population
Year	Pop.	±% p.a.
1968	256	—
1975	222	−2.02%
1982	186	−2.50%
1990	182	−0.27%
1999	198	+0.94%
2007	220	+1.33%
2012	259	+3.32%
2017	249	−0.78%
2023	243	−0.41%
Source: INSEE

== See also ==
- Communes of the Ardèche department
