= Gluiras =

- Commune
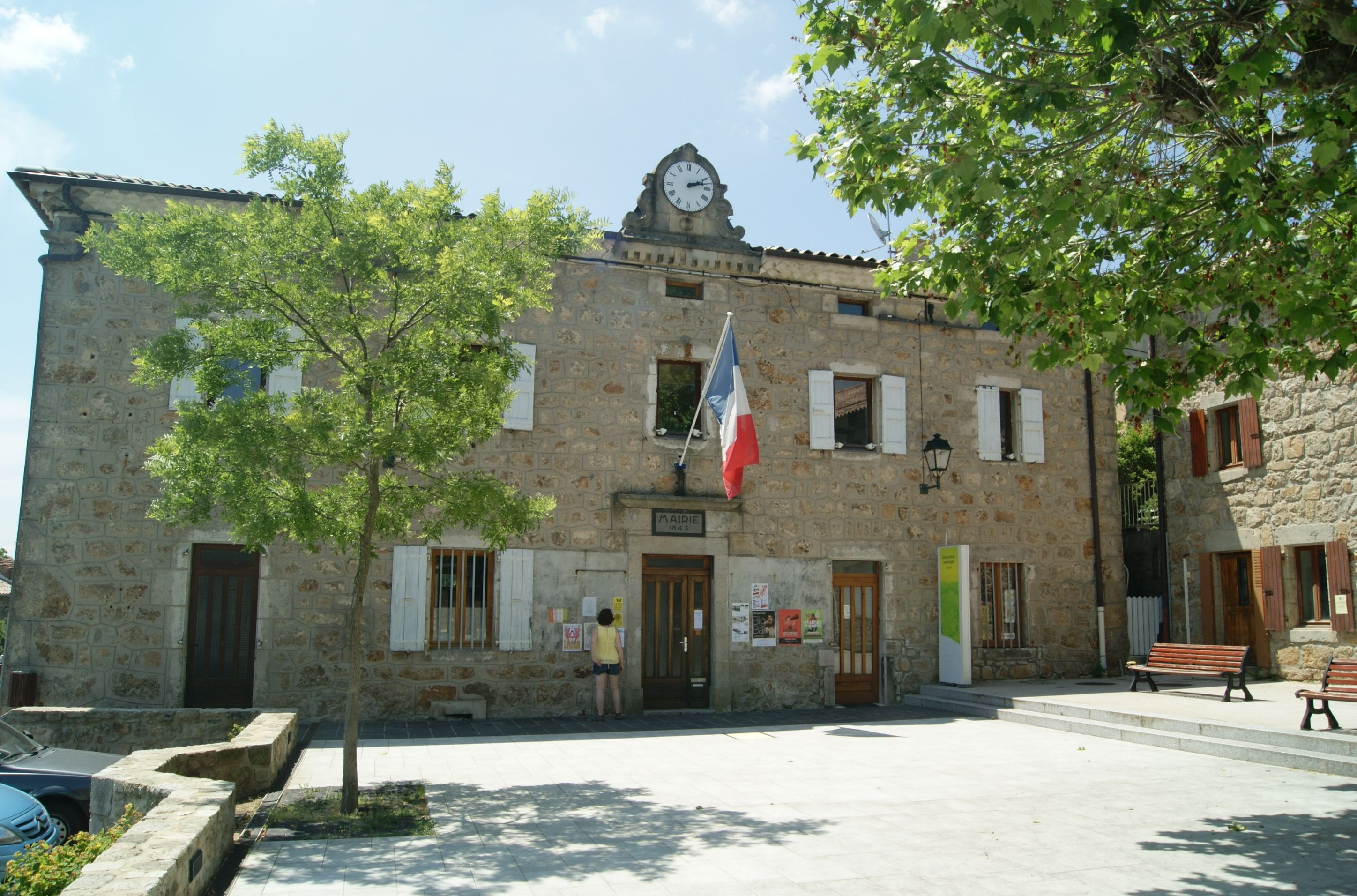
- The town hall in Gluiras
- Location of Gluiras
- Location within France Location within Auvergne-Rhône-Alpes
- Coordinates: 44°50′52″N 4°31′25″E
- Country: France
- Region: Auvergne-Rhône-Alpes
- Department: Ardèche
- Arrondissement: Privas
- Canton: Haut-Eyrieux
- Intercommunality: CA Privas Centre Ardèche

Government
  - Mayor (2020–2026): Ali-Patrick Louahala
- Area^{1}: 25.10 km^{2} (9.69 sq mi)
- Highest elevation: 1,046 m (3,432 ft)
- Lowest elevation: 219 m (719 ft)
- Population (2023): 366
  - Density: 14.6/km^{2} (37.8/sq mi)
- Time zone: UTC+01:00 (CET)
  - Summer (DST): UTC+02:00 (CEST)
- INSEE/Postal code: 07096 /07190
- ^{1} French Land Register data, which excludes lakes, ponds, glaciers > 1 km^{2} (0.386 sq mi or 247 acres) and river estuaries.

Gluiras (French pronunciation: [ɡlɥiʁas]; Occitan: Gluiràs) is a commune in the Ardèche department in southern France.

== Population ==
Historical population
Year	Pop.	±% p.a.
1968	591	—
1975	452	−3.76%
1982	398	−1.80%
1990	380	−0.58%
1999	349	−0.94%
2007	388	+1.33%
2012	382	−0.31%
2017	369	−0.69%
2023	366	−0.14%
Source: INSEE

== See also ==
- Communes of the Ardèche department
