= Saint-Priest, Ardèche =

Saint-Priest
- Commune
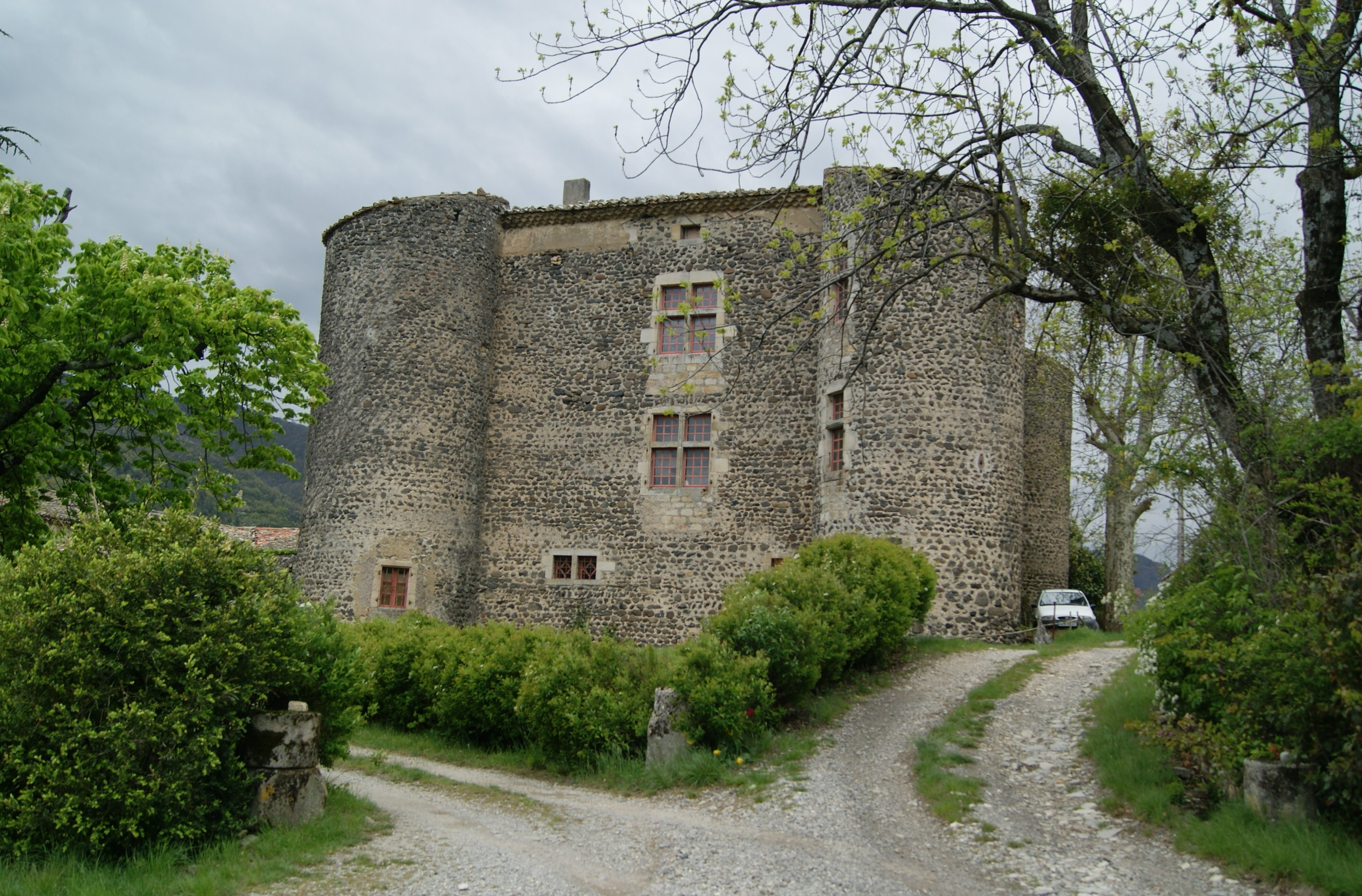
- The château in Saint-Priest
- Location of Saint-Priest
- Location within France Location within Auvergne-Rhône-Alpes
- Coordinates: 44°43′02″N 4°32′49″E
- Country: France
- Region: Auvergne-Rhône-Alpes
- Department: Ardèche
- Arrondissement: Privas
- Canton: Privas
- Intercommunality: CA Privas Centre Ardèche

Government
  - Mayor (2020–2026): Sandrine Chareyre
- Area^{1}: 19.15 km^{2} (7.39 sq mi)
- Elevation: 420 m (1,380 ft)
- Highest elevation: 1,019 m (3,343 ft)
- Lowest elevation: 278 m (912 ft)
- Population (2023): 1,345
  - Density: 70.23/km^{2} (181.9/sq mi)
- Time zone: UTC+01:00 (CET)
  - Summer (DST): UTC+02:00 (CEST)
- INSEE/Postal code: 07288 /07000
- ^{1} French Land Register data, which excludes lakes, ponds, glaciers > 1 km^{2} (0.386 sq mi or 247 acres) and river estuaries.

Saint-Priest (French pronunciation: [sɛ̃ pʁi(jɛst)]; Occitan: Sant Priest) is a commune in the Ardèche department in southern France.

== Population ==
Historical population
Year	Pop.	±% p.a.
1968	486	—
1975	550	+1.78%
1982	749	+4.51%
1990	968	+3.26%
1999	1,107	+1.50%
2007	1,208	+1.10%
2012	1,292	+1.35%
2017	1,200	−1.47%
2023	1,345	+1.92%
Source: INSEE

== See also ==
- Communes of the Ardèche department
