= Pourchères =

- Commune
- Location of Pourchères
- Location within France Location within Auvergne-Rhône-Alpes
- Coordinates: 44°44′52″N 4°30′26″E
- Country: France
- Region: Auvergne-Rhône-Alpes
- Department: Ardèche
- Arrondissement: Privas
- Canton: Privas
- Intercommunality: CA Privas Centre Ardèche

Government
  - Mayor (2020–2026): Roland Sady
- Area^{1}: 7.64 km^{2} (2.95 sq mi)
- Elevation: 650 m (2,130 ft)
- Highest elevation: 1,041 m (3,415 ft)
- Lowest elevation: 428 m (1,404 ft)
- Population (2023): 136
  - Density: 17.8/km^{2} (46.1/sq mi)
- Time zone: UTC+01:00 (CET)
  - Summer (DST): UTC+02:00 (CEST)
- INSEE/Postal code: 07179 /07000
- ^{1} French Land Register data, which excludes lakes, ponds, glaciers > 1 km^{2} (0.386 sq mi or 247 acres) and river estuaries.

Pourchères (French pronunciation: [puʁʃɛʁ]; Occitan: Porcheiras) is a commune in the Ardèche department in southern France.

== Population ==
Historical population
Year	Pop.	±% p.a.
1968	94	—
1975	72	−3.74%
1982	86	+2.57%
1990	117	+3.92%
1999	118	+0.09%
2007	132	+1.41%
2012	144	+1.76%
2017	131	−1.87%
2023	136	+0.63%
Source: INSEE

== See also ==
- Communes of the Ardèche department
