= Gilhac-et-Bruzac =

- Commune
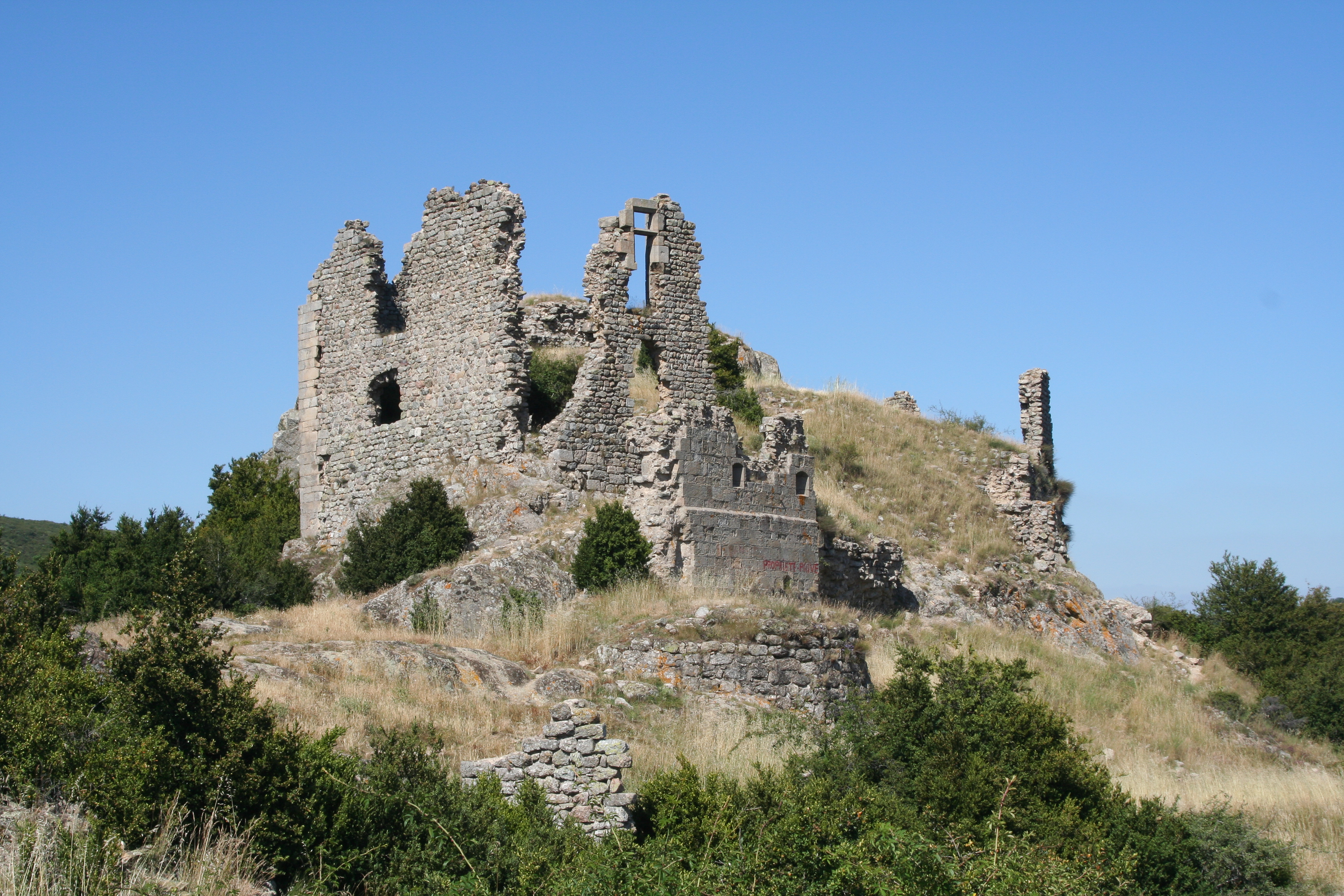
- Ruins of the chateau of Pierregourde
- Location of Gilhac-et-Bruzac
- Location within France Location within Auvergne-Rhône-Alpes
- Coordinates: 44°51′38″N 4°43′47″E
- Country: France
- Region: Auvergne-Rhône-Alpes
- Department: Ardèche
- Arrondissement: Privas
- Canton: Rhône-Eyrieux
- Intercommunality: CA Privas Centre Ardèche

Government
  - Mayor (2020–2026): Gilbert Bouvier
- Area^{1}: 30.94 km^{2} (11.95 sq mi)
- Elevation: 600 m (2,000 ft)
- Highest elevation: 786 m (2,579 ft)
- Lowest elevation: 160 m (520 ft)
- Population (2023): 172
  - Density: 5.56/km^{2} (14.4/sq mi)
- Time zone: UTC+01:00 (CET)
  - Summer (DST): UTC+02:00 (CEST)
- INSEE/Postal code: 07094 /07800
- ^{1} French Land Register data, which excludes lakes, ponds, glaciers > 1 km^{2} (0.386 sq mi or 247 acres) and river estuaries.

Gilhac-et-Bruzac is a commune in the Ardèche department in southern France.

== Population ==
Historical population
Year	Pop.	±% p.a.
1968	138	—
1975	108	−3.44%
1982	113	+0.65%
1990	138	+2.53%
1999	115	−2.01%
2007	147	+3.12%
2012	160	+1.71%
2017	170	+1.22%
2023	172	+0.20%
Source: INSEE

== See also ==
- Communes of the Ardèche department
