= Creysseilles =

Commune in France

- Commune
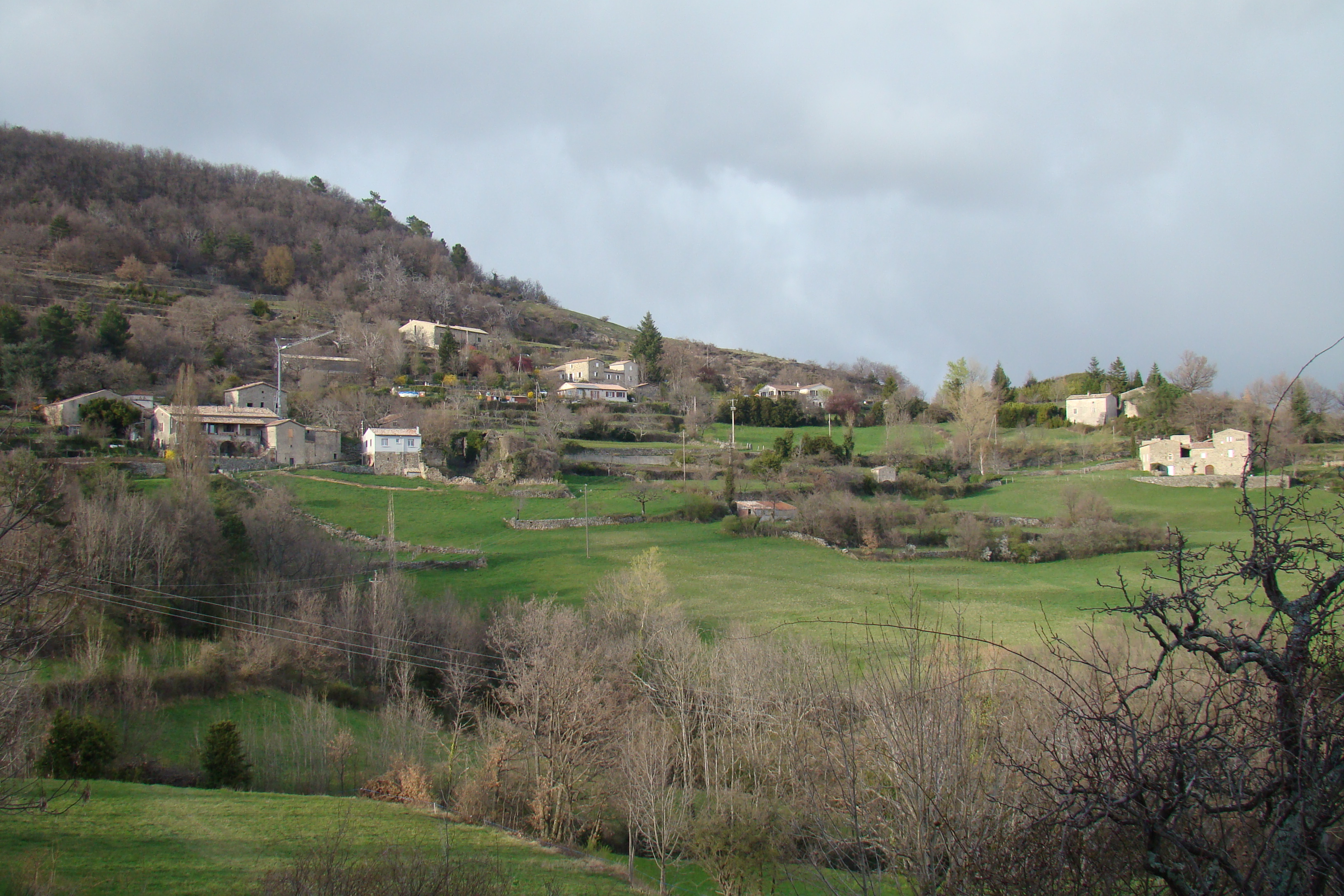
- Le Village de Creysseilles
- Location of Creysseilles
- Location within France Location within Auvergne-Rhône-Alpes
- Coordinates: 44°45′21″N 4°32′40″E
- Country: France
- Region: Auvergne-Rhône-Alpes
- Department: Ardèche
- Arrondissement: Privas
- Canton: Privas
- Intercommunality: CA Privas Centre Ardèche

Government
  - Mayor (2020–2026): Marc-Antoine Sangès
- Area^{1}: 10.25 km^{2} (3.96 sq mi)
- Elevation: 450 m (1,480 ft)
- Highest elevation: 924 m (3,031 ft)
- Lowest elevation: 337 m (1,106 ft)
- Population (2023): 158
  - Density: 15.4/km^{2} (39.9/sq mi)
- Time zone: UTC+01:00 (CET)
  - Summer (DST): UTC+02:00 (CEST)
- INSEE/Postal code: 07074 /07000
- ^{1} French Land Register data, which excludes lakes, ponds, glaciers > 1 km^{2} (0.386 sq mi or 247 acres) and river estuaries.

Creysseilles (French pronunciation: [kʁesɛj]; Occitan: Creisselhas) is a commune in the Ardèche department in southern France.

== Population ==
Historical population
Year	Pop.	±% p.a.
1968	114	—
1975	98	−2.14%
1982	107	+1.26%
1990	116	+1.01%
1999	110	−0.59%
2007	136	+2.69%
2012	119	−2.64%
2017	147	+4.32%
2023	158	+1.21%
Source: INSEE

== See also ==
- Communes of the Ardèche department
