= Freyssenet =

- Commune
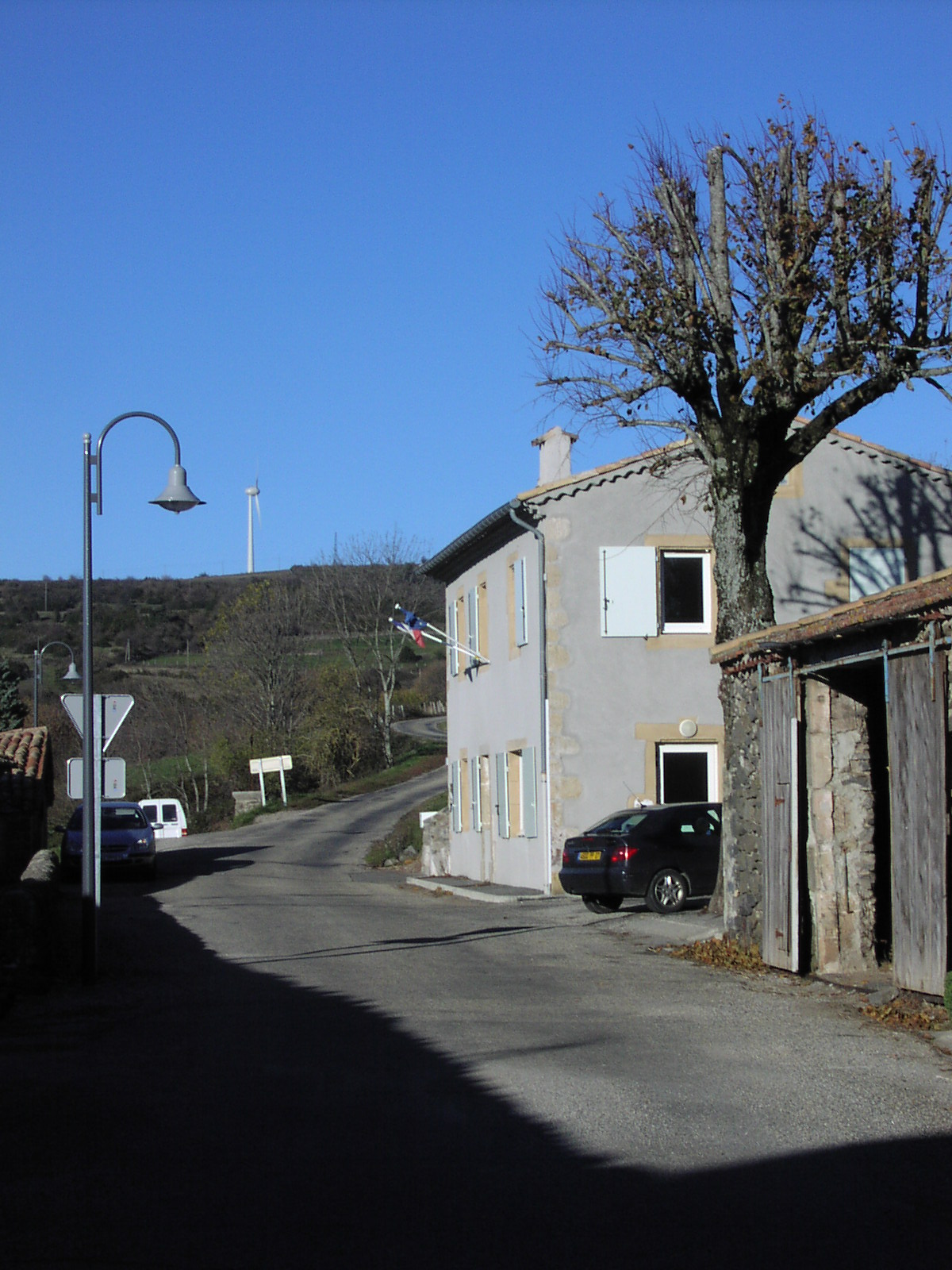
- The old school in Freyssenet
- Location of Freyssenet
- Location within France Location within Auvergne-Rhône-Alpes
- Coordinates: 44°41′00″N 4°32′32″E
- Country: France
- Region: Auvergne-Rhône-Alpes
- Department: Ardèche
- Arrondissement: Privas
- Canton: Privas
- Intercommunality: CA Privas Centre Ardèche

Government
  - Mayor (2020–2026): Jean-Pierre Ladreyt
- Area^{1}: 9.54 km^{2} (3.68 sq mi)
- Elevation: 800 m (2,600 ft)
- Highest elevation: 909 m (2,982 ft)
- Lowest elevation: 356 m (1,168 ft)
- Population (2023): 48
  - Density: 5.0/km^{2} (13/sq mi)
- Time zone: UTC+01:00 (CET)
  - Summer (DST): UTC+02:00 (CEST)
- INSEE/Postal code: 07092 /07000
- ^{1} French Land Register data, which excludes lakes, ponds, glaciers > 1 km^{2} (0.386 sq mi or 247 acres) and river estuaries.

Freyssenet is a commune in the Ardèche department in southern France.

== Population ==
Historical population
| Year | Pop. | ±% p.a. |
|---|---|---|
| 1968 | 89 | — |
| 1975 | 65 | −4.39% |
| 1982 | 65 | +0.00% |
| 1990 | 46 | −4.23% |
| 1999 | 49 | +0.70% |
| 2007 | 53 | +0.99% |
| 2012 | 50 | −1.16% |
| 2017 | 47 | −1.23% |
| 2023 | 48 | +0.35% |
Source: INSEE

== See also ==
- Communes of the Ardèche department
