= Lyas =

- Commune
- Location of Lyas
- Location within France Location within Auvergne-Rhône-Alpes
- Coordinates: 44°44′25″N 4°36′02″E
- Country: France
- Region: Auvergne-Rhône-Alpes
- Department: Ardèche
- Arrondissement: Privas
- Canton: Privas
- Intercommunality: CA Privas Centre Ardèche

Government
  - Mayor (2020–2026): François Veyreinc
- Area^{1}: 7.95 km^{2} (3.07 sq mi)
- Elevation: 575 m (1,886 ft)
- Highest elevation: 803 m (2,635 ft)
- Lowest elevation: 220 m (720 ft)
- Population (2023): 592
  - Density: 74.5/km^{2} (193/sq mi)
- Time zone: UTC+01:00 (CET)
  - Summer (DST): UTC+02:00 (CEST)
- INSEE/Postal code: 07146 /07000
- ^{1} French Land Register data, which excludes lakes, ponds, glaciers > 1 km^{2} (0.386 sq mi or 247 acres) and river estuaries.

Lyas (French pronunciation: [ljas]; Occitan: Lias) is a commune in the Ardèche department in southern France.

== Population ==
Historical population
Year	Pop.	±% p.a.
1968	417	—
1975	423	+0.20%
1982	491	+2.15%
1990	506	+0.38%
1999	517	+0.24%
2007	562	+1.05%
2012	577	+0.53%
2017	601	+0.82%
2023	592	−0.25%
Source: INSEE

== See also ==
- Communes of the Ardèche department
