= Saint-Julien-du-Gua =

- Commune
- Location of Saint-Julien-du-Gua
- Location within France Location within Auvergne-Rhône-Alpes
- Coordinates: 44°46′08″N 4°26′40″E
- Country: France
- Region: Auvergne-Rhône-Alpes
- Department: Ardèche
- Arrondissement: Privas
- Canton: Haut-Eyrieux
- Intercommunality: CA Privas Centre Ardèche

Government
  - Mayor (2020–2026): Francis Giraud
- Area^{1}: 16.96 km^{2} (6.55 sq mi)
- Elevation: 650 m (2,130 ft)
- Highest elevation: 1,329 m (4,360 ft)
- Lowest elevation: 430 m (1,410 ft)
- Population (2023): 169
  - Density: 9.96/km^{2} (25.8/sq mi)
- Time zone: UTC+01:00 (CET)
  - Summer (DST): UTC+02:00 (CEST)
- INSEE/Postal code: 07253 /07190
- ^{1} French Land Register data, which excludes lakes, ponds, glaciers > 1 km^{2} (0.386 sq mi or 247 acres) and river estuaries.

Saint-Julien-du-Gua (French pronunciation: [sɛ̃ ʒyljɛ̃ dy ɡa]; Occitan: Sant Julian dau Ga) is a commune in the Ardèche department in southern France.

== Population ==
Historical population
Year	Pop.	±% p.a.
1968	316	—
1975	262	−2.64%
1982	216	−2.72%
1990	187	−1.79%
1999	174	−0.80%
2007	185	+0.77%
2012	156	−3.35%
2017	190	+4.02%
2023	169	−1.93%
Source: INSEE

== See also ==
- Communes of the Ardèche department
