= Rompon =

- Commune
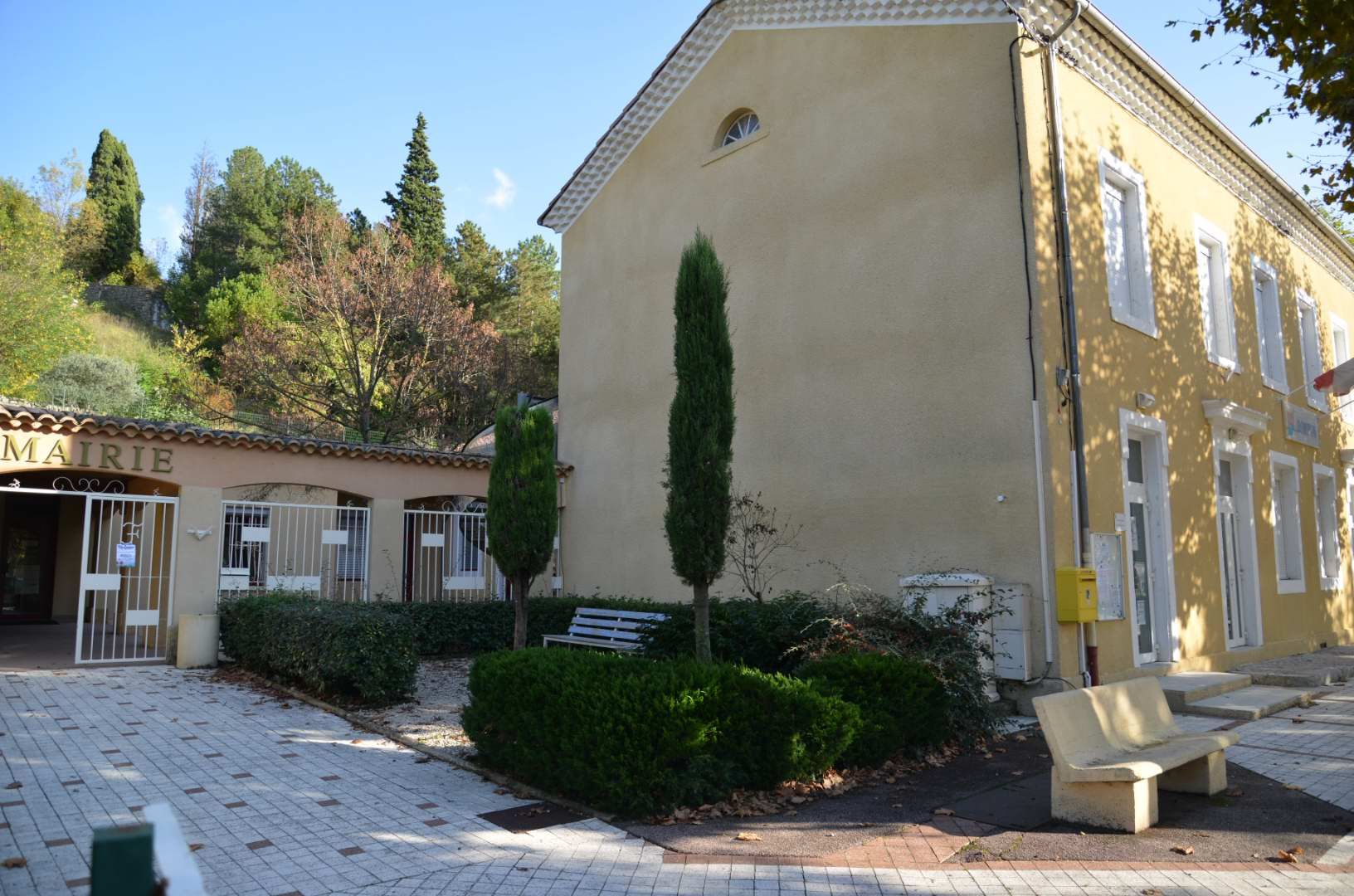
- The town hall in Rompon
- Location of Rompon
- Location within France Location within Auvergne-Rhône-Alpes
- Coordinates: 44°45′44″N 4°43′27″E
- Country: France
- Region: Auvergne-Rhône-Alpes
- Department: Ardèche
- Arrondissement: Privas
- Canton: Le Pouzin
- Intercommunality: CA Privas Centre Ardèche

Government
  - Mayor (2020–2026): Yann Vivat
- Area^{1}: 22.03 km^{2} (8.51 sq mi)
- Elevation: 113 m (371 ft)
- Highest elevation: 510 m (1,670 ft)
- Lowest elevation: 85 m (279 ft)
- Population (2023): 1,139
  - Density: 51.70/km^{2} (133.9/sq mi)
- Time zone: UTC+01:00 (CET)
  - Summer (DST): UTC+02:00 (CEST)
- INSEE/Postal code: 07198 /07250
- ^{1} French Land Register data, which excludes lakes, ponds, glaciers > 1 km^{2} (0.386 sq mi or 247 acres) and river estuaries.

Rompon (French pronunciation: [ʁɔ̃pɔ̃]) is a commune in the Ardèche department in southern France.

== Population ==
Historical population
| Year | Pop. | ±% p.a. |
|---|---|---|
| 1968 | 513 | — |
| 1975 | 451 | −1.82% |
| 1982 | 585 | +3.79% |
| 1990 | 722 | +2.67% |
| 1999 | 863 | +2.00% |
| 2007 | 956 | +1.29% |
| 2012 | 996 | +0.82% |
| 2017 | 1,083 | +1.69% |
| 2023 | 1,139 | +0.84% |
Source: INSEE

== See also ==
- Communes of the Ardèche department
