= Baix =

- Commune
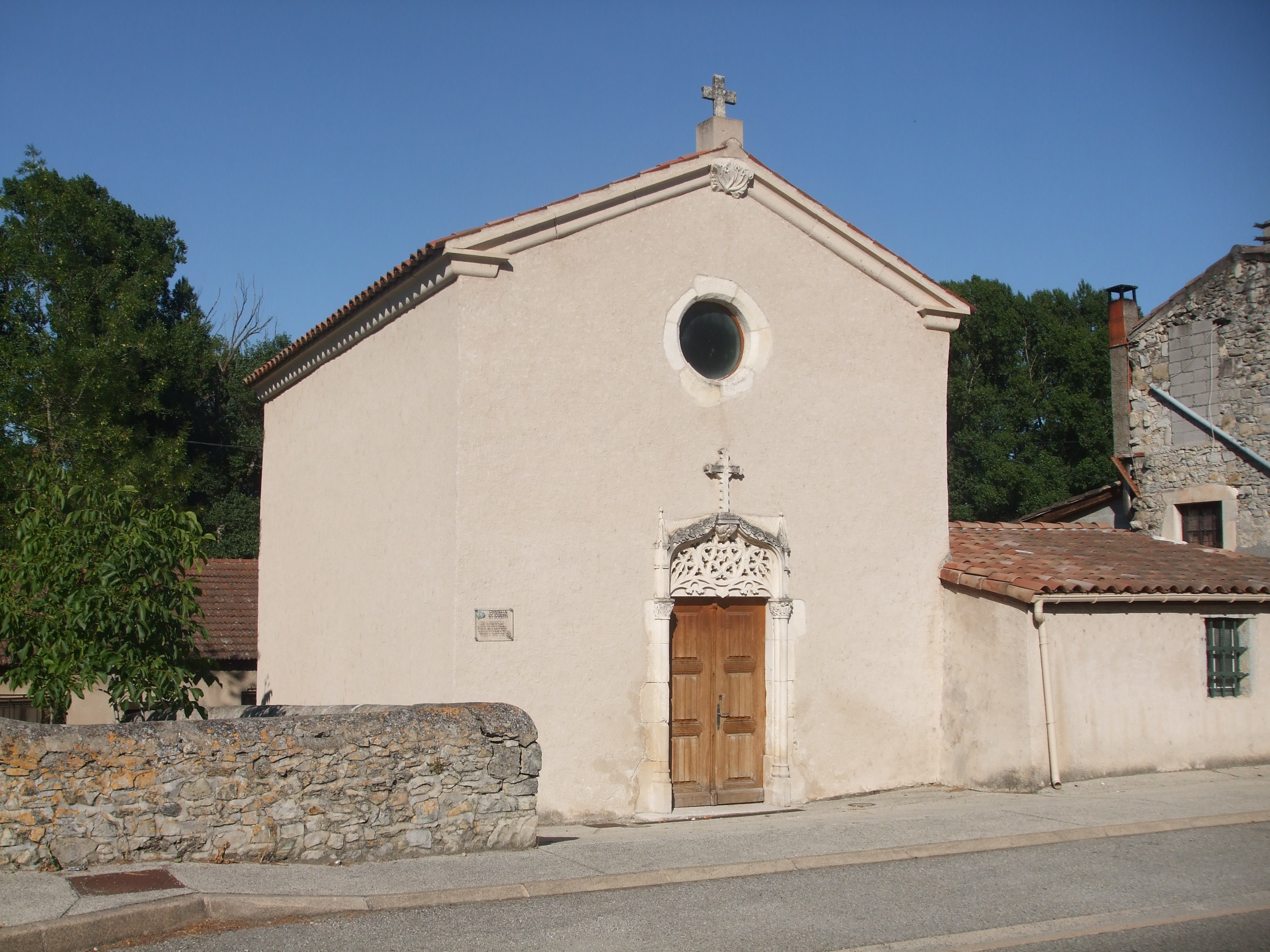
- The Chapel of Saint Joseph
- Location of Baix
- Location within France Location within Auvergne-Rhône-Alpes
- Coordinates: 44°42′47″N 4°45′53″E
- Country: France
- Region: Auvergne-Rhône-Alpes
- Department: Ardèche
- Arrondissement: Privas
- Canton: Le Pouzin

Government
  - Mayor (2020–2026): Yves Boyer
- Area^{1}: 17.39 km^{2} (6.71 sq mi)
- Elevation: 94 m (308 ft)
- Highest elevation: 457 m (1,499 ft)
- Lowest elevation: 76 m (249 ft)
- Population (2023): 1,296
  - Density: 74.53/km^{2} (193.0/sq mi)
- Time zone: UTC+01:00 (CET)
  - Summer (DST): UTC+02:00 (CEST)
- INSEE/Postal code: 07022 /07210
- ^{1} French Land Register data, which excludes lakes, ponds, glaciers > 1 km^{2} (0.386 sq mi or 247 acres) and river estuaries.

Baix (French pronunciation: [bɛks]; Occitan: Bais) is a commune in the Ardèche department in the Auvergne-Rhône-Alpes region of southern France.

== Geography ==
Baix is located some 30 km (19 mi) south by southwest of Valence and 25 km (16 mi) northeast of Aubenas. Access to the commune is by the D86 road from Le Pouzin in the north which passes through the commune and the town and continues south to Cruas. The D22 branches off the D86 just inside the northern border of the commune and goes west to Chomérac. The commune is mostly forested but with farmland in the northwestern third of the commune.

The Rhône river forms the eastern border of the commune and the department as it flows south however there is no crossing point in the commune. The nearest crossing point is at Le Pouzin 5 km (3.1 mi) north. Numerous streams rise in the commune and flow east to the Rhone including La Payre, the Ravin de Roux, the Ravin de Saint-Pierre, the Ruisseau de Notre-Dame, the Ravin de Besset, the Ruisseau de Cournairet, the Ruisseau de Sainte-Euphémie, with the Ruisseau de Sichier forming the southern border of the commune.

=== Neighbouring communes and villages ===
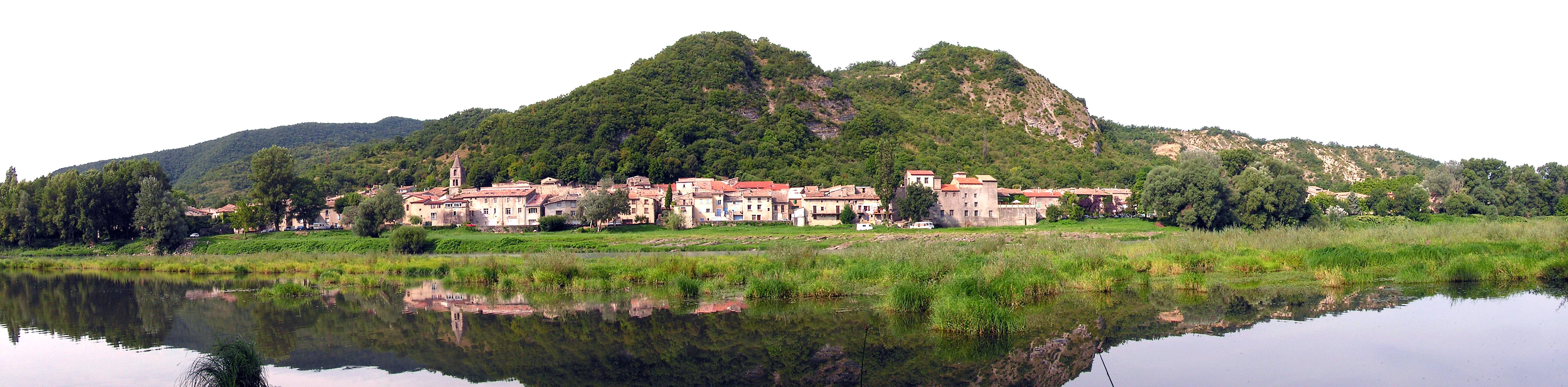
Panorama of the town

== History ==
The banks of the Rhone at Baix have been occupied since Roman times.

Many islands existed at the level of the plain of the Payre river which allowed for fords across the Rhone.

There was a Greco-Roman town between Le Pouzin and Baix which was at the junction between the Antoninus Pius Roman way on the right bank of the Rhône and the Via Agrippa on the left bank. It is possible that Hannibal, advancing out of Spain, crossed the Rhône at this place with his elephants in about 218 BC before crossing the Alps.

The name of this town was Batiana meaning "easy passage", a name probably given by a Phoenician colony to indicate the ease that of crossing the Rhone in this place (batos = 'easy' or 'feasible' with ana = 'crossing') thanks to number of islands in the river at this point.

Batiana had a ferry to cross the Rhône and a horse relay.

The town lay on both banks of the river and perhaps also in the islands. As an obligatory place of passage, Batiana had to endure numerous invasions and destruction. It survived until the invasion of the Vandals in 411. The population of Batiana escaped the massacre and returned after an unknown time to rebuild the town on the ruins left by the Vandals. This new town was destroyed again in 735 by the Saracens who ravaged the entire Rhône Valley to Lyon at that time.

A new Batiana emerged from the ruins. The new population of Latin origin were not the same people as the former Phoenician population who abandoned their former homes and settled north of the Ouvèze at Le Pouzin leaving the Greek people in the south on the right bank of the Rhône at Baix.

The town was sheltered behind fortifications. To the south Baios (Baix) was created and Pusillus (Le Pouzin) to the north. Baios was first called Bacium, then Bacxus, Bays sur Bays, then finally Baix.

The remains of buildings and several ceramic tile graves have been uncovered around the Chapel of Saint Euphémie.

== Administration ==
List of Successive Mayors

From	To	Name
1760		Charles André Bouvier
2001	2014	Alain Laurent
2014	current	Yves Boyer

== Demography ==
The inhabitants of the commune are known as Baixois or Baixoises in French.

Historical population

Year	Pop.	±% p.a.
1793	974	—
1800	829	−2.28%
1806	1,061	+4.20%
1821	1,254	+1.12%
1831	1,314	+0.47%
1836	1,363	+0.73%
1841	1,322	−0.61%
1846	1,288	−0.52%
1851	1,336	+0.73%
1856	1,290	−0.70%
1861	1,313	+0.35%
1866	1,225	−1.38%
1872	1,233	+0.11%
1876	1,208	−0.51%
1881	1,088	−2.07%
1886	1,055	−0.61%
1891	993	−1.20%
1896	970	−0.47%
1901	887	−1.77%

Year	Pop.	±% p.a.
1906	854	−0.76%
1911	841	−0.31%
1921	801	−0.49%
1926	741	−1.55%
1931	683	−1.62%
1936	643	−1.20%
1946	575	−1.11%
1954	607	+0.68%
1962	643	+0.72%
1968	609	−0.90%
1975	546	−1.55%
1982	961	+8.41%
1990	748	−3.08%
1999	822	+1.05%
2007	1,009	+2.60%
2012	1,047	+0.74%
2017	1,164	+2.14%
2023	1,296	+1.81%

Source: EHESS and INSEE

== Culture and heritage ==
=== Civil heritage ===
The commune has several buildings and sites that are registered as historical monuments:

- La Cardinale Inn (17th century)
- A Clock Tower (1600)
- The Louis XVI Fountain and Lavoir (Puvblic laundry) (18th century)

Other sites of interest

- Old Renaissance Houses
- The Rhone floodway to feed the centre of Logis-Neuf
- The Géronton Stadium

=== Religious heritage ===
- The Croix Rouge Wayside Cross (17th century) is registered as an historical monument

Other religious sites

- The Church of Sainte-Euphémie which has been frequently altered
- The Chapel of Saint Joseph

== See also ==
- Communes of the Ardèche department

=== Bibliography ===
- Archaeological Map of Roman Gaul, André Blanc, fascicule XV, CNRS, 1975, p 66, article No. 78 on the Chapel of Sainte-Euphémie.
