= René Ladreit de La Charrière =

French politician

- Born: 11 February 1767; Privas, Vivarais, Kingdom of France
- Died: 12 January 1845 (aged 77); La Charrière, Ardèche, France
- Occupations: Landowner, politician

René Ladreit de La Charrière (1767–1845) was a French landlord and politician. He served as a member of the Chamber of Deputies from 1815 to 1823. He became a Knight of the Legion of Honour in 1821.
