= Coux, Ardèche =

Coux
- Commune
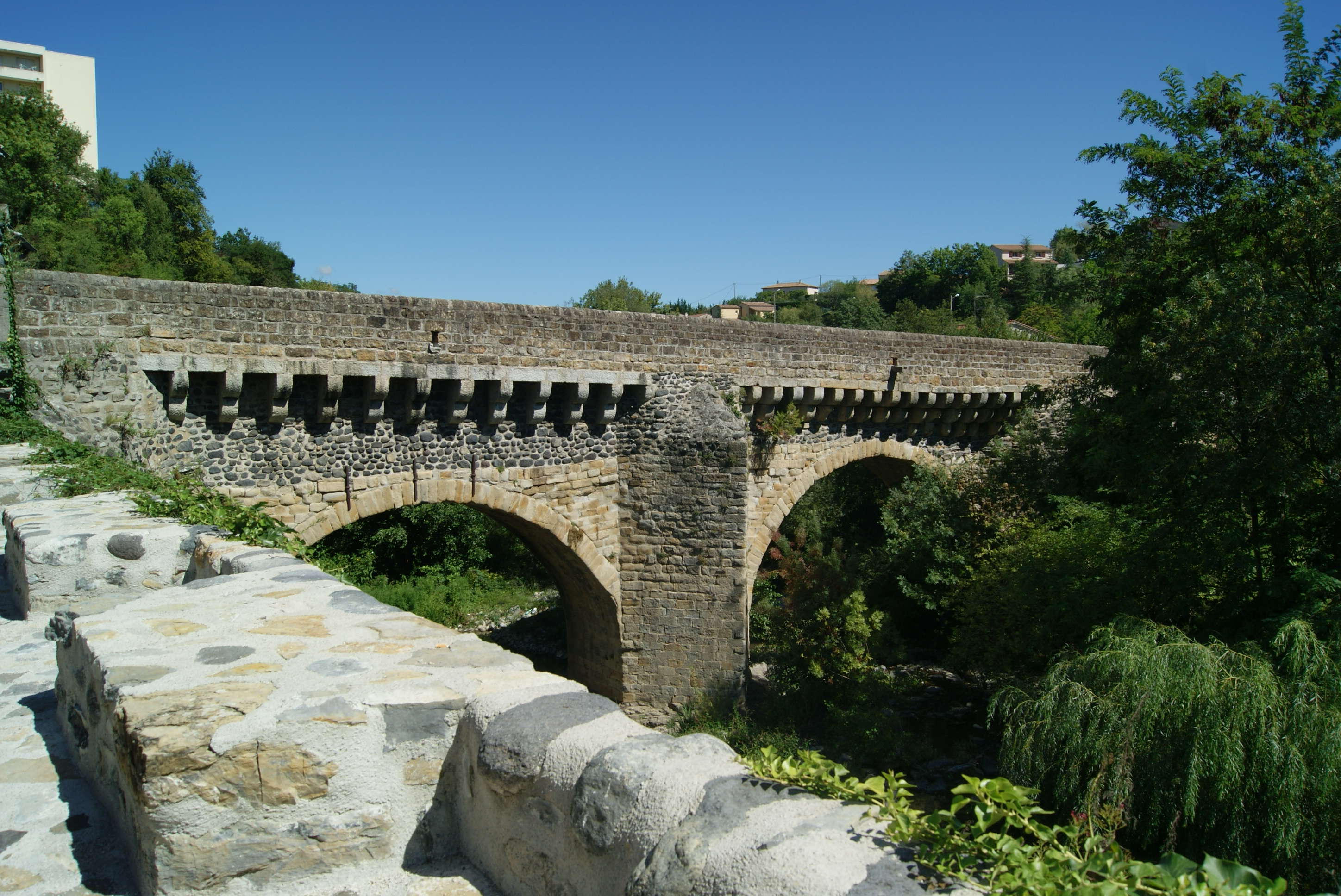
- Louis XIII bridge
- Location of Coux
- Location within France Location within Auvergne-Rhône-Alpes
- Coordinates: 44°44′06″N 4°37′16″E
- Country: France
- Region: Auvergne-Rhône-Alpes
- Department: Ardèche
- Arrondissement: Privas
- Canton: Privas
- Intercommunality: CA Privas Centre Ardèche

Government
  - Mayor (2020–2026): Jean-Pierre Jeanne
- Area^{1}: 12.02 km^{2} (4.64 sq mi)
- Elevation: 201 m (659 ft)
- Highest elevation: 807 m (2,648 ft)
- Lowest elevation: 170 m (560 ft)
- Population (2023): 1,635
  - Density: 136.0/km^{2} (352.3/sq mi)
- Time zone: UTC+01:00 (CET)
  - Summer (DST): UTC+02:00 (CEST)
- INSEE/Postal code: 07072 /07000
- ^{1} French Land Register data, which excludes lakes, ponds, glaciers > 1 km^{2} (0.386 sq mi or 247 acres) and river estuaries.

Coux (French pronunciation: [kuks]; Occitan: Cos) is a commune of the Ardèche department in southern France.

== Population ==
Historical population
Year	Pop.	±% p.a.
1968	806	—
1975	953	+2.42%
1982	1,418	+5.84%
1990	1,501	+0.71%
1999	1,464	−0.28%
2007	1,599	+1.11%
2012	1,689	+1.10%
2017	1,642	−0.56%
2023	1,635	−0.07%
Source: INSEE

== See also ==
- Communes of the Ardèche department
