= Flaviac =

- Commune
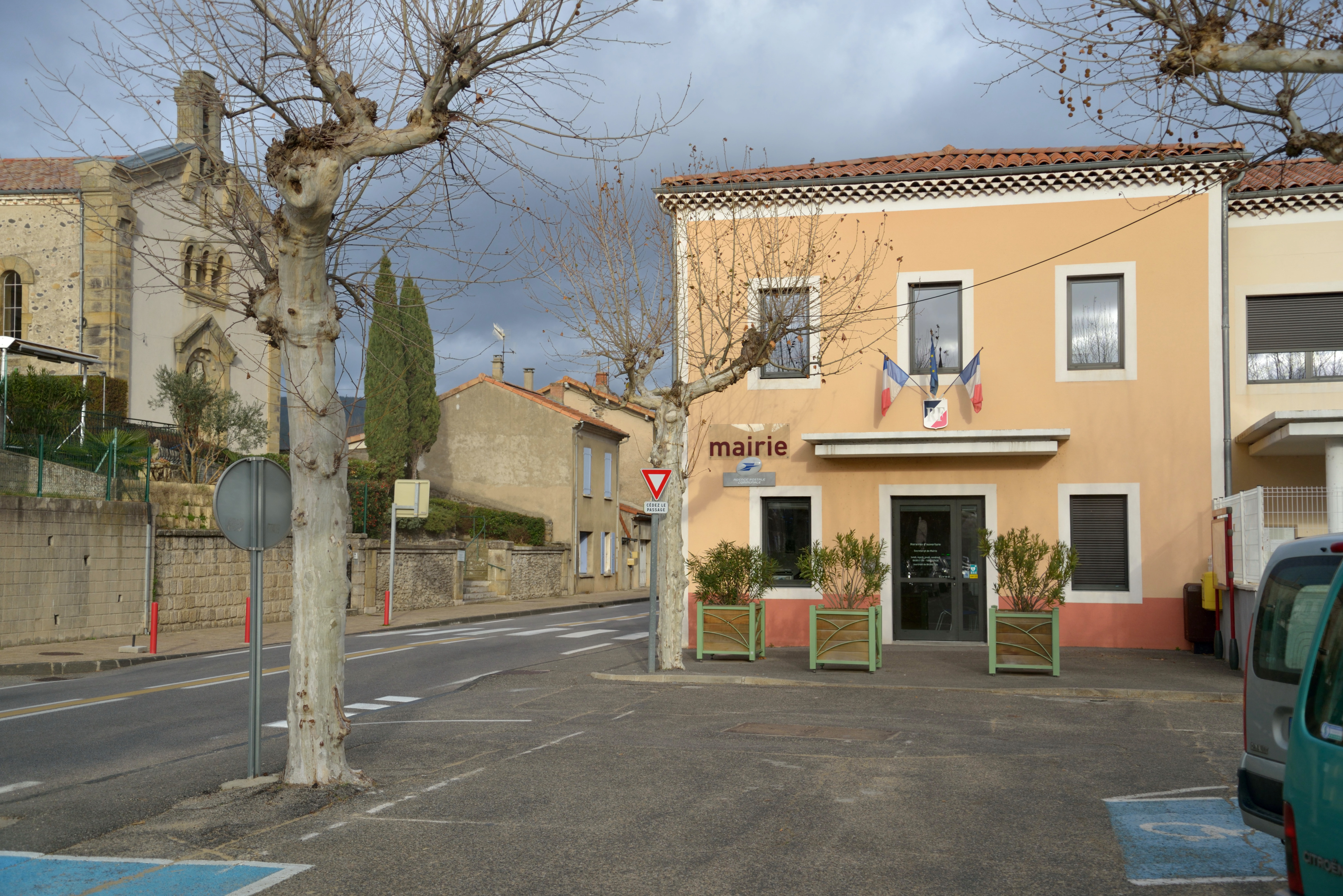
- The town hall in Flaviac
- Location of Flaviac
- Location within France Location within Auvergne-Rhône-Alpes
- Coordinates: 44°44′54″N 4°40′29″E
- Country: France
- Region: Auvergne-Rhône-Alpes
- Department: Ardèche
- Arrondissement: Privas
- Canton: Privas
- Intercommunality: CA Privas Centre Ardèche

Government
  - Mayor (2020–2026): Michel Constant
- Area^{1}: 12.98 km^{2} (5.01 sq mi)
- Elevation: 160 m (520 ft)
- Highest elevation: 828 m (2,717 ft)
- Lowest elevation: 125 m (410 ft)
- Population (2023): 1,235
  - Density: 95.15/km^{2} (246.4/sq mi)
- Time zone: UTC+01:00 (CET)
  - Summer (DST): UTC+02:00 (CEST)
- INSEE/Postal code: 07090 /07000
- ^{1} French Land Register data, which excludes lakes, ponds, glaciers > 1 km^{2} (0.386 sq mi or 247 acres) and river estuaries.

Flaviac (French pronunciation: [flavjak]) is a commune in the Ardèche department in southern France.

== Population ==
Historical population
Year	Pop.	±% p.a.
1968	870	—
1975	829	−0.69%
1982	912	+1.37%
1990	993	+1.07%
1999	1,092	+1.06%
2007	1,107	+0.17%
2012	1,155	+0.85%
2017	1,223	+1.15%
2023	1,235	+0.16%
Source: INSEE

== International relations ==
Flaviac is twinned with:

- Bistagno, Italy
- Spinone al Lago, Italy

== See also ==
- Communes of the Ardèche department
