= Communauté d'agglomération Privas Centre Ardèche =

Privas Centre Ardèche
- Communauté d'agglomération
- Interactive map of Privas Centre Ardèche
- Coordinates: 44°48′N 04°38′E
- Country: France
- Region: Auvergne-Rhône-Alpes
- Department: Ardèche
- No. of communes: {{{nbcomm}}}
- Established: 2017
- Area: 602.1 km^{2} (232.5 sq mi)
- Population (2019): 43,792
  - Density: 72.73/km^{2} (188.4/sq mi)
- Website: www.privas-centre-ardeche.fr

Communauté d'agglomération Privas Centre Ardèche is the communauté d'agglomération, an intercommunal structure, centred on the town of Privas. It is located in the Ardèche department, in the Auvergne-Rhône-Alpes region, southern France. Created in 2017, its seat is in Privas. Its area is 602.1 km^{2}. Its population was 43,792 in 2019, of which 8,465 in Privas proper.

== Composition ==
The communauté d'agglomération consists of the following 42 communes:

1. Ajoux
2. Alissas
3. Beauchastel
4. Beauvène
5. Chalencon
6. Châteauneuf-de-Vernoux
7. Chomérac
8. Coux
9. Creysseilles
10. Dunière-sur-Eyrieux
11. Flaviac
12. Freyssenet
13. Gilhac-et-Bruzac
14. Gluiras
15. Gourdon
16. Lyas
17. Marcols-les-Eaux
18. Les Ollières-sur-Eyrieux
19. Pourchères
20. Le Pouzin
21. Pranles
22. Privas
23. Rochessauve
24. Rompon
25. Saint-Apollinaire-de-Rias
26. Saint-Cierge-la-Serre
27. Saint-Étienne-de-Serre
28. Saint-Fortunat-sur-Eyrieux
29. Saint-Jean-Chambre
30. Saint-Julien-du-Gua
31. Saint-Julien-en-Saint-Alban
32. Saint-Julien-le-Roux
33. Saint-Laurent-du-Pape
34. Saint-Maurice-en-Chalencon
35. Saint-Michel-de-Chabrillanoux
36. Saint-Priest
37. Saint-Sauveur-de-Montagut
38. Saint-Vincent-de-Durfort
39. Silhac
40. Vernoux-en-Vivarais
41. Veyras
42. La Voulte-sur-Rhône
