= Gourdon, Ardèche =

Gourdon
- Commune
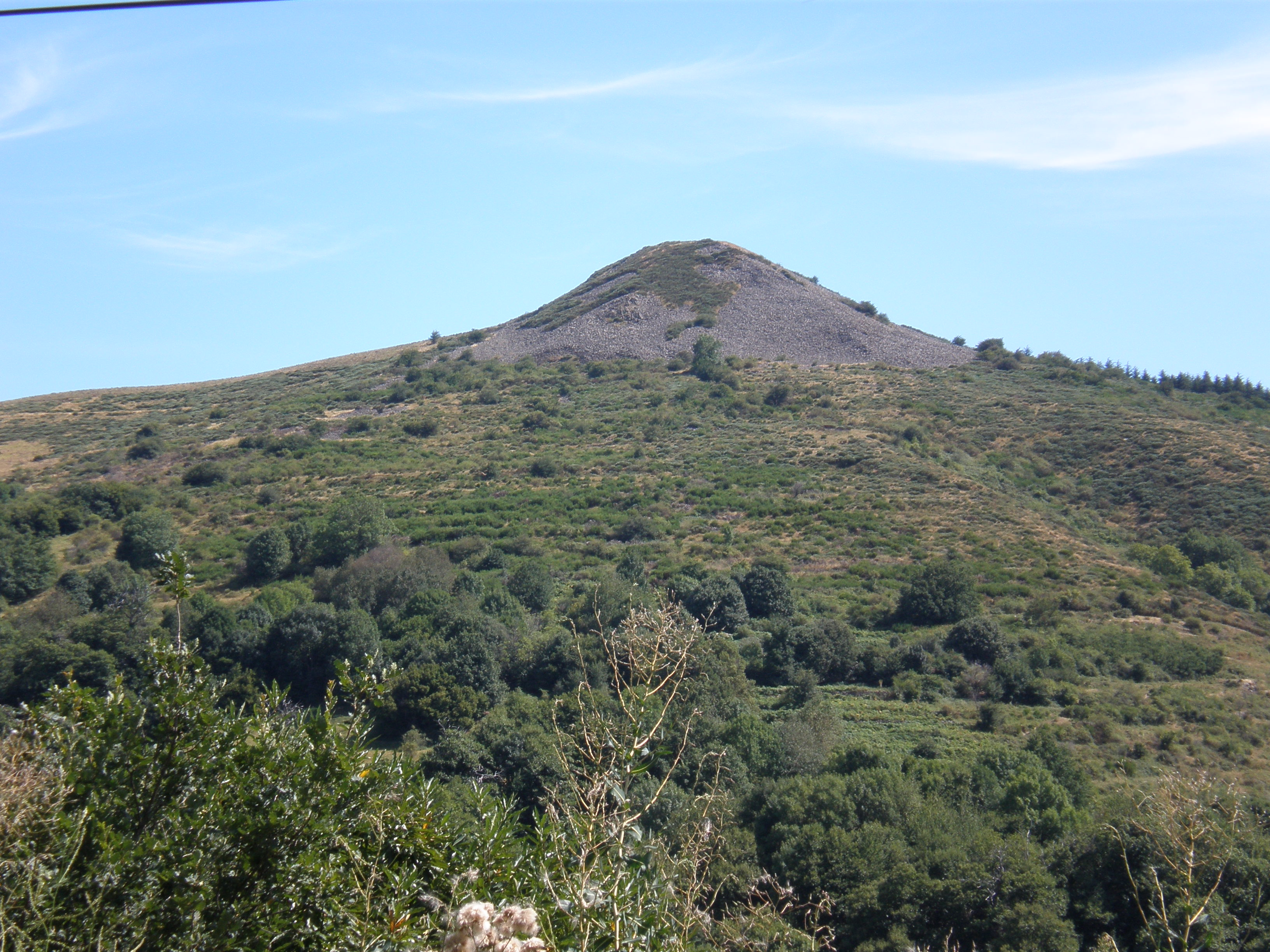
- Roche de Gourdon
- Location of Gourdon
- Location within France Location within Auvergne-Rhône-Alpes
- Coordinates: 44°43′56″N 4°26′56″E
- Country: France
- Region: Auvergne-Rhône-Alpes
- Department: Ardèche
- Arrondissement: Privas
- Canton: Privas
- Intercommunality: CA Privas Centre Ardèche

Government
  - Mayor (2020–2026): Marie-Josée Serre
- Area^{1}: 12.84 km^{2} (4.96 sq mi)
- Elevation: 600 m (2,000 ft)
- Highest elevation: 1,068 m (3,504 ft)
- Lowest elevation: 514 m (1,686 ft)
- Population (2023): 85
  - Density: 6.6/km^{2} (17/sq mi)
- Time zone: UTC+01:00 (CET)
  - Summer (DST): UTC+02:00 (CEST)
- INSEE/Postal code: 07098 /07000
- ^{1} French Land Register data, which excludes lakes, ponds, glaciers > 1 km^{2} (0.386 sq mi or 247 acres) and river estuaries.

Gourdon (French pronunciation: [ɡuʁdɔ̃]) is a commune in of the Ardèche department in southern France.

== Population ==
Historical population
| Year | Pop. | ±% p.a. |
|---|---|---|
| 1968 | 133 | — |
| 1975 | 99 | −4.13% |
| 1982 | 96 | −0.44% |
| 1990 | 83 | −1.80% |
| 1999 | 79 | −0.55% |
| 2007 | 85 | +0.92% |
| 2012 | 94 | +2.03% |
| 2017 | 88 | −1.31% |
| 2023 | 85 | −0.58% |
Source: INSEE

== See also ==
- Communes of the Ardèche department
