= Canton of Privas =

Coordinates: 44.73°N 4.60°E

- Canton
- Situation of the canton of Privas in the department of Ardèche
- Country: France
- Region: Auvergne-Rhône-Alpes
- Department: Ardèche
- No. of communes: {{{nbcomm}}}
- Population (2023): 21,054
- INSEE code: 0710

The canton of Privas is an administrative division of the Ardèche department, southern France. Its borders were modified at the French canton reorganisation which came into effect in March 2015. Its seat is in Privas.

It consists of the following communes:

1. Ajoux
2. Alissas
3. Chomérac
4. Coux
5. Creysseilles
6. Flaviac
7. Freyssenet
8. Gourdon
9. Lyas
10. Pourchères
11. Pranles
12. Privas
13. Rochessauve
14. Saint-Priest
15. Veyras
