= Rochessauve =

- Commune
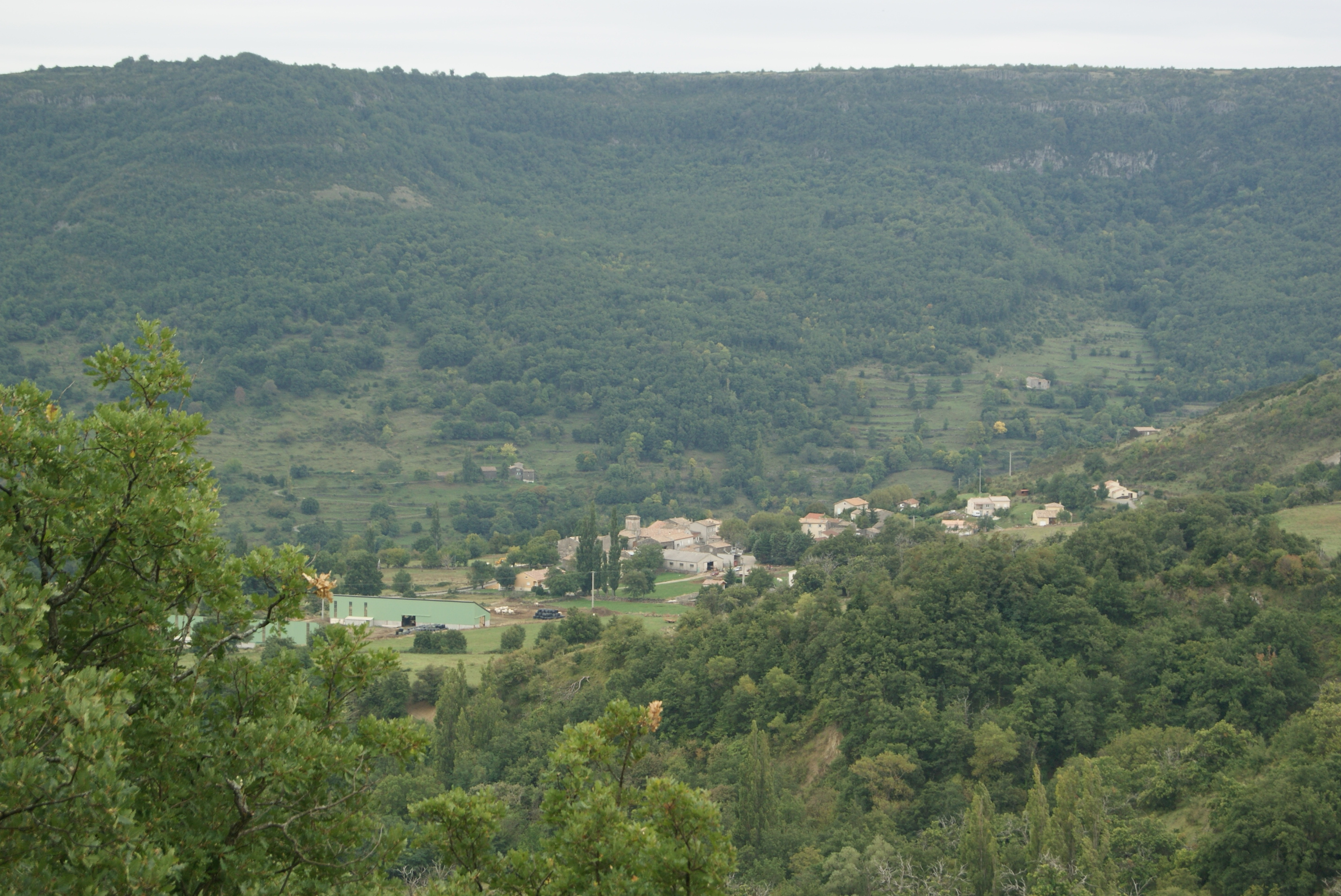
- A general view of Rochessauve
- Location of Rochessauve
- Location within France Location within Auvergne-Rhône-Alpes
- Coordinates: 44°40′49″N 4°37′36″E
- Country: France
- Region: Auvergne-Rhône-Alpes
- Department: Ardèche
- Arrondissement: Privas
- Canton: Privas
- Intercommunality: CA Privas Centre Ardèche

Government
  - Mayor (2020–2026): Sébastien Vernet
- Area^{1}: 17.62 km^{2} (6.80 sq mi)
- Elevation: 400 m (1,300 ft)
- Highest elevation: 824 m (2,703 ft)
- Lowest elevation: 219 m (719 ft)
- Population (2023): 495
  - Density: 28.1/km^{2} (72.8/sq mi)
- Time zone: UTC+01:00 (CET)
  - Summer (DST): UTC+02:00 (CEST)
- INSEE/Postal code: 07194 /07210
- ^{1} French Land Register data, which excludes lakes, ponds, glaciers > 1 km^{2} (0.386 sq mi or 247 acres) and river estuaries.

Rochessauve (French pronunciation: [ʁɔʃsov]; Occitan: Ròchasauva) is a commune in the Ardèche department in southern France.

== Population ==
Historical population
Year	Pop.	±% p.a.
1968	239	—
1975	218	−1.31%
1982	250	+1.98%
1990	301	+2.35%
1999	300	−0.04%
2007	378	+2.93%
2012	410	+1.64%
2017	450	+1.88%
2023	495	+1.60%
Source: INSEE

== See also ==
- Communes of the Ardèche department
