= Veyras, Ardèche =

Veyras
- Commune
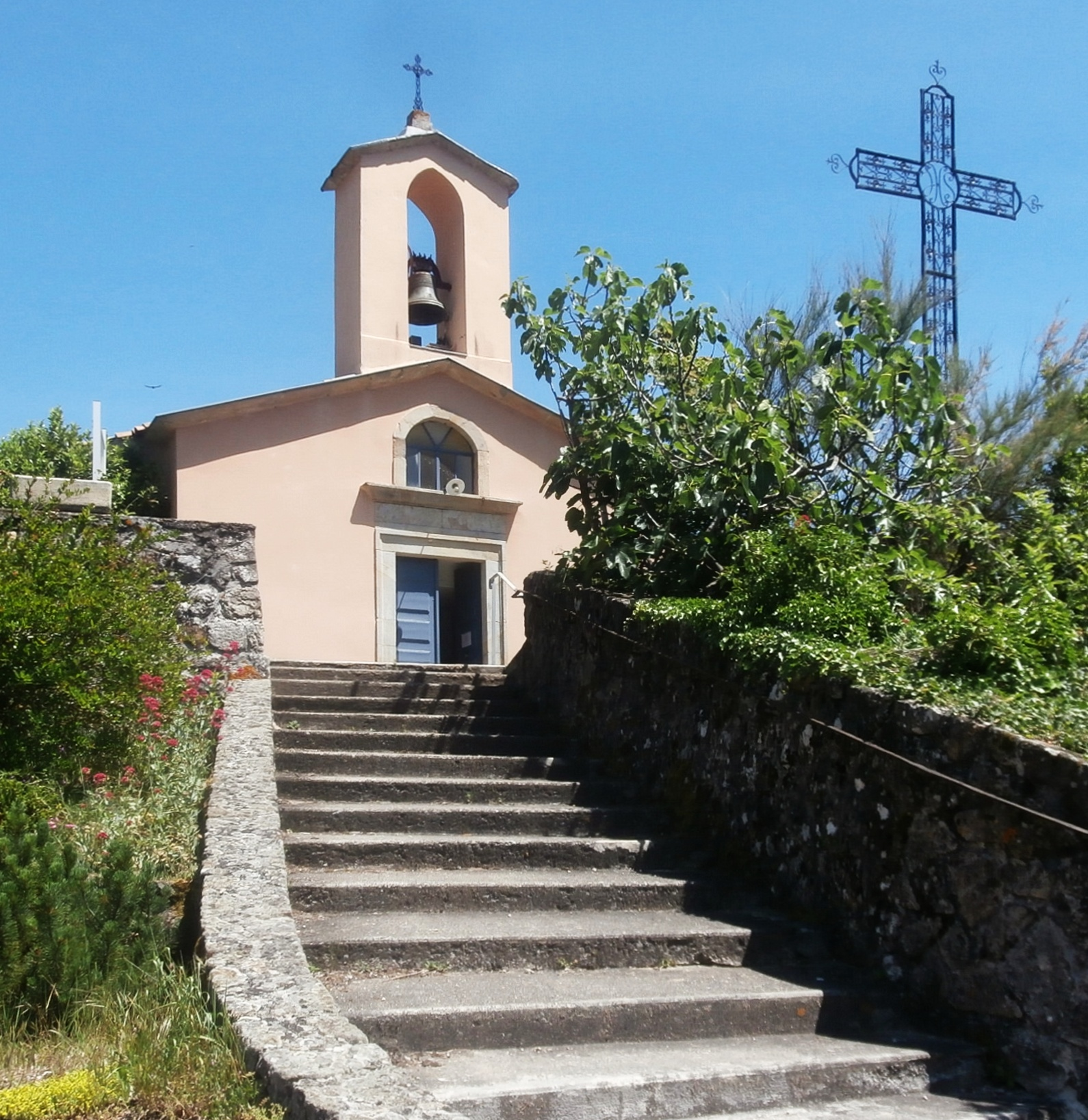
- The church in Veyras
- Location of Veyras
- Location within France Location within Auvergne-Rhône-Alpes
- Coordinates: 44°44′05″N 4°33′43″E
- Country: France
- Region: Auvergne-Rhône-Alpes
- Department: Ardèche
- Arrondissement: Privas
- Canton: Privas
- Intercommunality: CA Privas Centre Ardèche

Government
  - Mayor (2020–2026): Alain Louche
- Area^{1}: 7.76 km^{2} (3.00 sq mi)
- Elevation: 435 m (1,427 ft)
- Highest elevation: 601 m (1,972 ft)
- Lowest elevation: 280 m (920 ft)
- Population (2023): 1,505
  - Density: 194/km^{2} (502/sq mi)
- Time zone: UTC+01:00 (CET)
  - Summer (DST): UTC+02:00 (CEST)
- INSEE/Postal code: 07340 /07000
- ^{1} French Land Register data, which excludes lakes, ponds, glaciers > 1 km^{2} (0.386 sq mi or 247 acres) and river estuaries.

Veyras is a commune in the Ardèche department in southern France.

== Population ==
Historical population
Year	Pop.	±% p.a.
1968	667	—
1975	847	+3.47%
1982	1,105	+3.87%
1990	1,418	+3.17%
1999	1,468	+0.39%
2007	1,549	+0.67%
2012	1,548	−0.01%
2017	1,527	−0.27%
2023	1,505	−0.24%
Source: INSEE

== See also ==
- Communes of the Ardèche department
