= Pranles =

- Commune
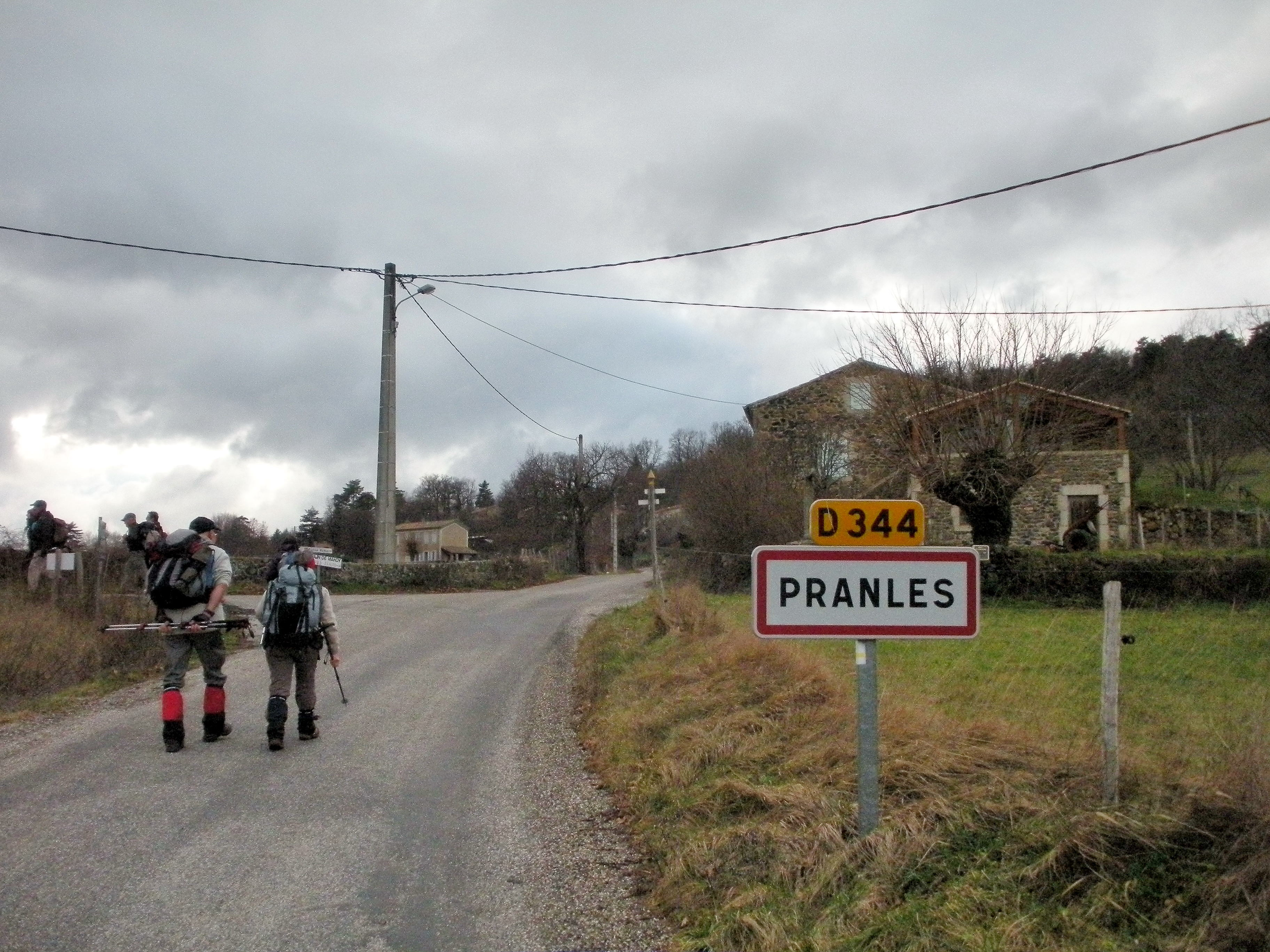
- The road into Pranles
- Location of Pranles
- Location within France Location within Auvergne-Rhône-Alpes
- Coordinates: 44°46′23″N 4°34′36″E
- Country: France
- Region: Auvergne-Rhône-Alpes
- Department: Ardèche
- Arrondissement: Privas
- Canton: Privas
- Intercommunality: CA Privas Centre Ardèche

Government
  - Mayor (2020–2026): Christophe Monteux
- Area^{1}: 29.49 km^{2} (11.39 sq mi)
- Highest elevation: 815 m (2,674 ft)
- Lowest elevation: 226 m (741 ft)
- Population (2023): 499
  - Density: 16.9/km^{2} (43.8/sq mi)
- Time zone: UTC+01:00 (CET)
  - Summer (DST): UTC+02:00 (CEST)
- INSEE/Postal code: 07184 /07000
- ^{1} French Land Register data, which excludes lakes, ponds, glaciers > 1 km^{2} (0.386 sq mi or 247 acres) and river estuaries.

Pranles (French pronunciation: [pʁɑ̃l]) is a commune in the Ardèche department in southern France.

== Population ==
Historical population
Year	Pop.	±% p.a.
1968	371	—
1975	356	−0.59%
1982	380	+0.94%
1990	389	+0.29%
1999	409	+0.56%
2007	444	+1.03%
2012	465	+0.93%
2017	491	+1.09%
2023	499	+0.27%
Source: INSEE

== See also ==
- Communes of the Ardèche department
