= Privas =

- Prefecture and commune
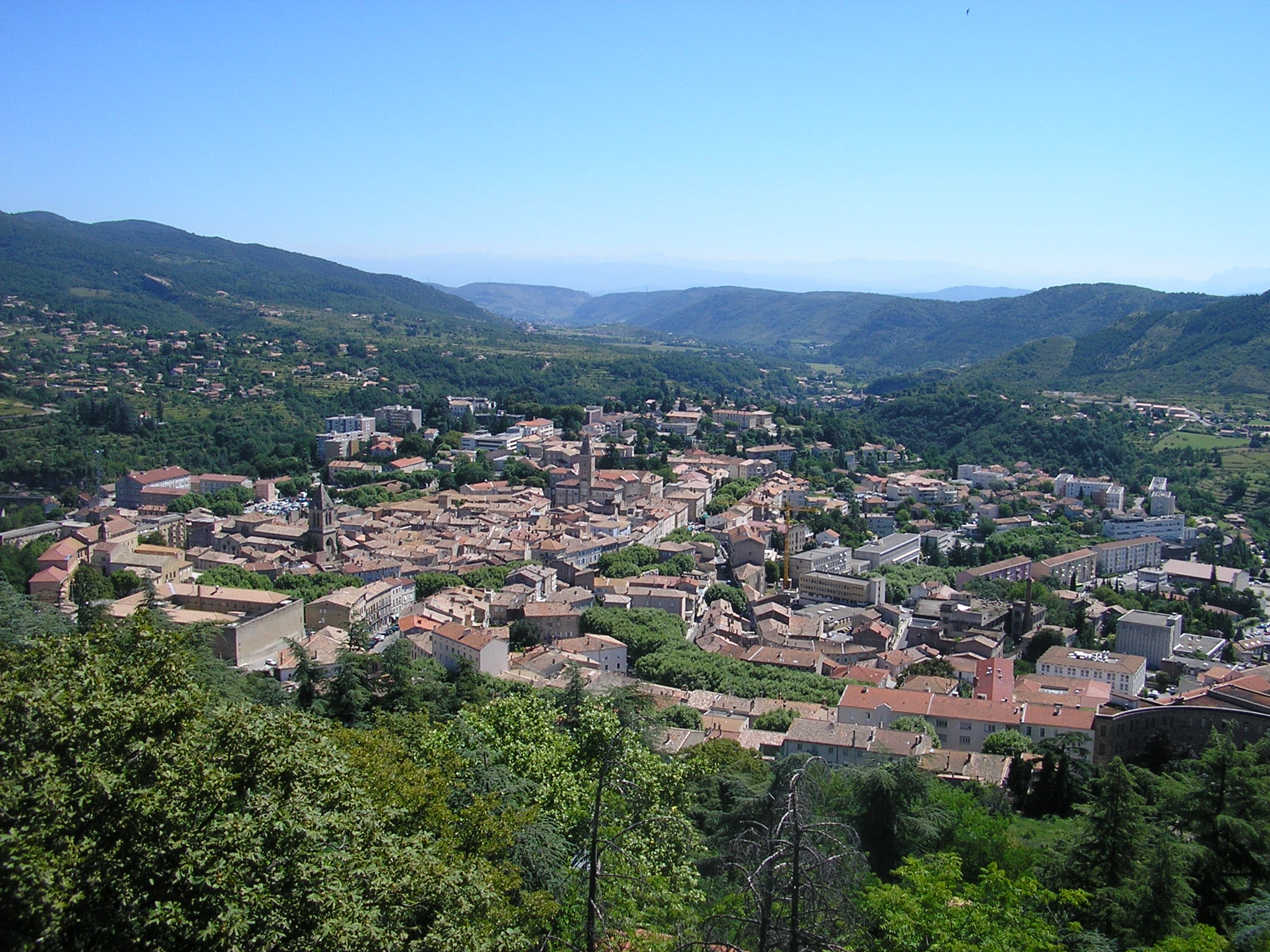
- A view of Privas from Le Montoulon

- Coat of arms
- Location of Privas
- Location within France Location within Auvergne-Rhône-Alpes
- Coordinates: 44°44′09″N 4°35′49″E
- Country: France
- Region: Auvergne-Rhône-Alpes
- Department: Ardèche
- Arrondissement: Privas
- Canton: Privas
- Intercommunality: CA Privas Centre Ardèche

Government
  - Mayor (2020–2026): Michel Valla
- Area^{1}: 12.14 km^{2} (4.69 sq mi)
- Elevation: 294 m (965 ft)
- Highest elevation: 750 m (2,460 ft)
- Lowest elevation: 200 m (660 ft)
- Population (2023): 8,538
  - Density: 703.3/km^{2} (1,822/sq mi)
- Time zone: UTC+01:00 (CET)
  - Summer (DST): UTC+02:00 (CEST)
- INSEE/Postal code: 07186 /07000
- ^{1} French Land Register data, which excludes lakes, ponds, glaciers > 1 km^{2} (0.386 sq mi or 247 acres) and river estuaries.

Privas (French pronunciation: [pʁiva]; Occitan: Privàs [pɾiˈβas], also Catalan: [pɾiˈbas]) is a city located in France, in the department of Ardèche.

With its 8,538 inhabitants (2023), it is the least populated prefecture (capital of a department).

It was the location of the 1629 Siege of Privas. Today, Privas is known for the purée made from the local chestnuts, and for its sweetened marron glacé.

== History ==
The earliest traces of the commune are attested in the hamlet of Lac where recent archaeological excavations have revealed a Roman villa dating to the beginning of the Empire, as well as a medieval burying-ground. Moulds for counterfeiting coinage found in the 19th century on the slopes of Mont-Toulon have not been interpretable as signifying a local centre of population.

Privas possibly comes from the old Gallic word briva meaning thoroughfare, or more specifically a wooden causeway over a ravine or water. This may refer to a river crossing now spanned by the Pont Louis XIII, just to the south of the town centre. Privas inhabitants are called Privadois.

The earliest bourg of Privas developed around the church of Saint-Thomas (place de la République), a dependency of the Cluniac priory of Rompon. The château (castri) of Privas on the site of the present collège-couvent des Récollets is not attested prior to the 13th century, when the town was walled. Laid waste in 1621 and again following the siege of 1629, nothing of it remains.

In the twelfth century Privas belonged to the seigneurie of the Poitiers-Valentinois, comtes de Valence, whose liege lords were the counts of Toulouse. Aymar de Poitiers, in 1281, and his son in 1309, granted charters to the town, guaranteeing its traditional liberties, and its fiscal, economic and military rights.

In the 13th century the town expanded from two originals centres, Bize and Clastre, to develop on the level towards the east, in two new quarters, Claux and Mazel.

In the 16th century, the Protestant Reformation took swift and deep roots in Privas, among common people, the high bourgeoisie and the nobles alike. Fierce repression was organized: many Protestant inhabitants were killed, and others fled to Geneva. Nevertheless, the reform movement spread, and for nearly seventy years no Catholic mass was said at Privas, where the church itself was demolished in 1570 and the French garrison refused entry. There were no Saint Bartholomew's Day Massacres at Privas.

Though the king's mistress Diane de Poitiers was made baronne of Chalencon and of Privas, and in 1566 the barony was divided between her two daughters, the elder retaining the honour of Privas, in the French Wars of Religion Privas remained a major centre of Huguenots, called the "Rampart of Reform", and the "Geneva of the country", a symbol of resistance to the Catholic monarchy. The seigneurie was sold to Jacques de Chambaud, a head of the Protestants, who became the first Huguenot seigneur of Privas.

In the Huguenot rebellions of 1621–29, Privas was besieged in 1629 by royal forces, with Louis XIII in attendance. Defended by Montbrun with 800 men, the city was taken and destroyed.

During the siege of 1629, the town of Privas was well defended by walls and ditches. Privas also has gorges to its south, east and north that provide a natural defence. Given this topography, the Huguenots in the town did not believe that a strong attack from the east was possible. Nevertheless, on 22 May, the Swiss mercenaries of the attacking Royalist Catholic army of Cardinal Richelieu managed to haul by hand six huge pieces of artillery, each weighing about four tons, from Tauléac across the Ouvèze river and up the zig-zag path onto the plateau of Le Vanel, to the east of the town walls. From this decisive vantage point they bombarded the town until its surviving defenders were forced to evacuate and take their last stand on Mont Toulon on its west. During the siege, five hundred Royalist attackers and one thousand Protestant defenders were killed. Surviving defenders were executed, imprisoned, or deported to be galley slaves. By fire or cannon, the majority of the buildings in the town were destroyed. Privas was a ghost town for many years after. It is estimated that as a result of the defeat of the Huguenots in the region, one-fifth of the Protestant population of the Ardèche emigrated. After the defeat of the Camisard revolt (1702–1715) a further 50,000 Archèche Protestants left France. Many fled to England or Switzerland.

During the French Revolution in the 1790s a guillotine was erected in the Place de la République. A number of clerics were executed. With the administrative reordering of the French Revolution, Privas, in alternation with Annonay, Aubenas, Bourg-Saint-Andéol and Tournon-sur-Rhône, became an administrative centre of Ardèche. After a brief interval as chef-lieu of its district, it was attached to the district of Coiron.

Before about 1870 only a minority of people in the area spoke (or even referred to themselves as) French. They spoke a Provençal-Occitan patois, similar to Catalan. 'Les français' were the incomers or the educated middle-class, who spoke French as their main language. There was also a cultural divide between the people of the Ardèche plateau (known as Padgels) and the valley inhabitants (known as a Royols).

== Economy ==
In the nineteenth century the town hosted a number of water-powered silk mills. Iron-ore mining was also a major activity, in the Ouvèze valley to the west of Privas. But mining had declined to the point of extinction by the First World War and the silk industry was mostly extinct by the Second. The town used to be linked to the main railway system by a branch line railway, and there were tramways to both Aubenas and Le Pouzin. These rail communications no longer exist. Privas's most famous products today are sugared chestnuts. A little wine is also produced in the area.

As a town and a préfecture, many people are employed as administrators. But local employment in the préfecture has been declining since the 1990s because of the amalgamation of many services within the Ardèche and Drôme départements. Tourism is a more vibrant sector for employment.

=== Transport ===
The nearest airports are Grenoble Alpes Isère Airport, located 156 km (97 mi) north east, Lyon-Saint Exupéry Airport, located 156 km (97 mi) north east, Marseille Provence Airport, located 192 km (119 mi) south east and Montpellier - Méditerranée Airport, located 194 km (121 mi) south west of Privas.

== Tourism ==
Privas has hotel accommodation, gîtes and camping sites. There are many local walks and other recreational activities. It is also a noted area for fossils. Situated with easy access to both the Rhône Valley and the Ardèche Gorges, tourist activity is increasing in the district.

== Population ==
Historical population

Year	Pop.	±% p.a.
1793	2,495	—
1800	2,923	+2.29%
1806	3,080	+0.88%
1821	3,878	+1.55%
1831	4,342	+1.14%
1836	4,219	−0.57%
1841	4,797	+2.60%
1846	5,233	+1.76%
1851	5,278	+0.17%
1856	5,202	−0.29%
1861	6,657	+5.06%
1866	7,204	+1.59%
1872	7,836	+1.41%
1876	7,753	−0.27%
1881	7,921	+0.43%
1886	7,600	−0.82%
1891	7,312	−0.77%
1896	7,843	+1.41%
1901	7,561	−0.73%

Year	Pop.	±% p.a.
1906	7,000	−1.53%
1911	7,290	+0.82%
1921	6,412	−1.28%
1926	6,681	+0.83%
1931	7,230	+1.59%
1936	7,733	+1.35%
1946	7,407	−0.43%
1954	7,558	+0.25%
1962	8,663	+1.72%
1968	10,080	+2.56%
1975	10,808	+1.00%
1982	10,345	−0.62%
1990	10,080	−0.32%
1999	9,170	−1.05%
2007	8,646	−0.73%
2012	8,312	−0.78%
2017	8,266	−0.11%
2023	8,538	+0.54%

Source: EHESS and INSEE (1968-2023)

== Personalities ==
- The French historian and Trotskyist Pierre Broué was born in Privas.
- The French footballer Cyril Théréau was born in Privas.
- The writer Dominique Dunois (1876–1959), winner of the 1928 edition of the Prix Femina, died in Privas.
- The Huguenots Marie Durand and her brother Pierre were born in Le Bouchet just north of Privas.
- René Ladreit de La Charrière (1767-1845), politician and member of Chamber of Deputies.

== International relations ==
Privas is twinned with:

- Tortona, Italy
- Weilburg, Germany
- Wetherby, United Kingdom
- Zevenaar, Netherlands

== See also ==
- Communes of the Ardèche department
