= Chomérac =

- Commune
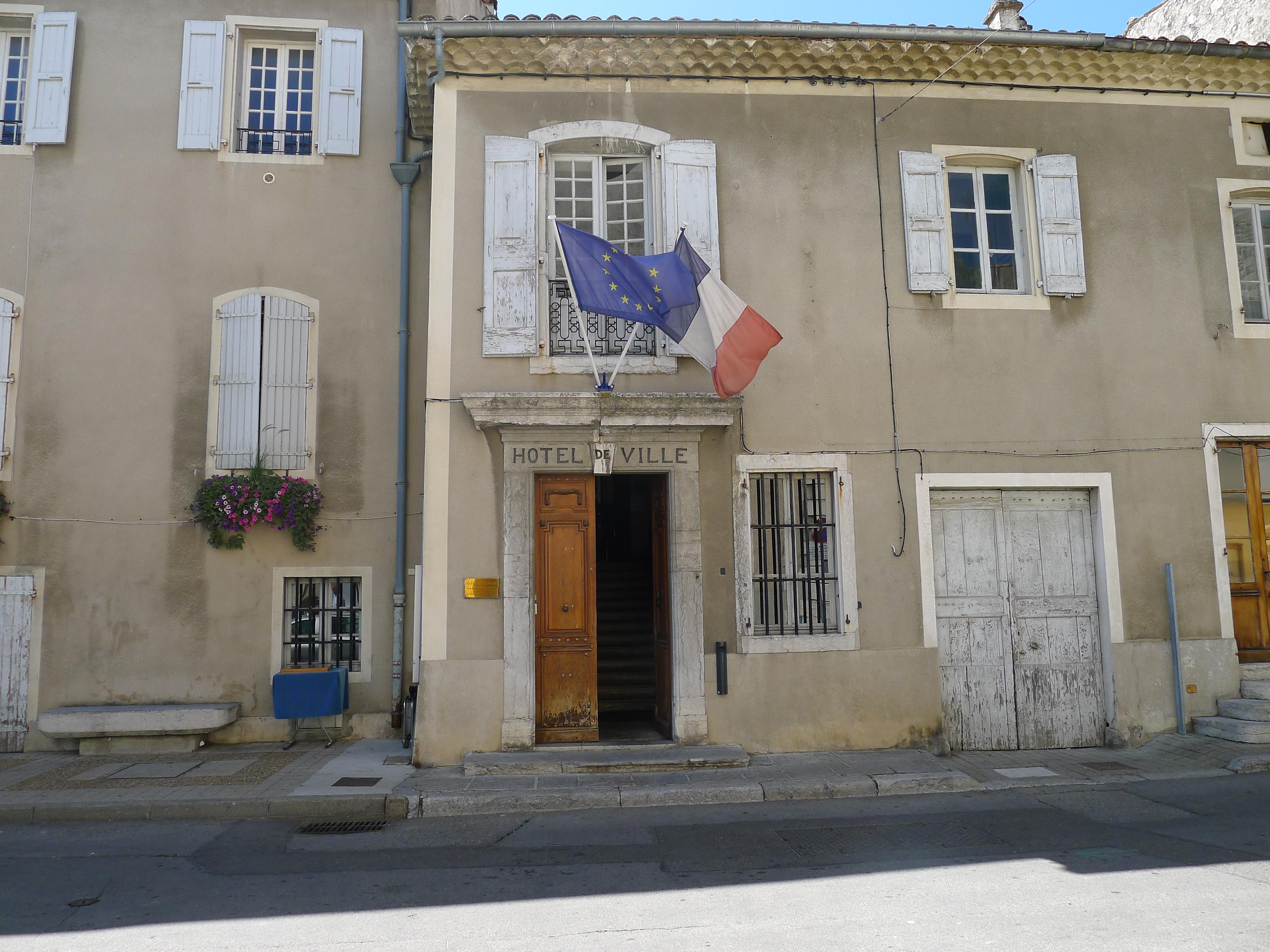
- Town hall
- Location of Chomérac
- Location within France Location within Auvergne-Rhône-Alpes
- Coordinates: 44°42′34″N 4°39′43″E
- Country: France
- Region: Auvergne-Rhône-Alpes
- Department: Ardèche
- Arrondissement: Privas
- Canton: Privas
- Intercommunality: CA Privas Centre Ardèche

Government
  - Mayor (2020–2026): François Arsac
- Area^{1}: 18.94 km^{2} (7.31 sq mi)
- Elevation: 200 m (660 ft)
- Highest elevation: 620 m (2,030 ft)
- Lowest elevation: 135 m (443 ft)
- Population (2023): 3,183
  - Density: 168.1/km^{2} (435.3/sq mi)
- Time zone: UTC+01:00 (CET)
  - Summer (DST): UTC+02:00 (CEST)
- INSEE/Postal code: 07066 /07210
- ^{1} French Land Register data, which excludes lakes, ponds, glaciers > 1 km^{2} (0.386 sq mi or 247 acres) and river estuaries.

Chomérac (French pronunciation: [ʃɔmeʁak]; Occitan: Tchaoumeïra) is a commune in the Ardèche department in southern France.

It is located approximately 10 km away from both the Rhône valley to the east and Privas (capital of the department) to the west.

== Geography ==
Chomérac is located on the eastern foothills of the Massif Central, 10 km (6.2 mi) away from the Rhône, in a large valley incised in cretaceous marls by the Payre and Vérone rivers, south east of the Jurassic limestone plateau of Les Grads and north of the Miocene basaltic plateau Les Coirons.

== History ==
As a natural pathway from Rhône valley to the Massif Central mountains, Chomérac has been inhabited for a very long time. First settlements records are found in caves and date back from the Middle Paleolithic. There are also evidences for Roman settlements and artefacts in the village (tegulae, villa and Roman road).

Chomérac was severely affected by the French Wars of Religion. In 1621, the village belonged to the catholic Duke of Ventadour. Besieged, it was occupied by the Protestant Monsieur de Blacons on 14 October 1621. Alternately besieged by both parties, the stronghold changed side six times, up until the siege of 1628, when the Catholics decisively took over the village from the Huguenots. This position was beneficial in 1629, during the siege of Privas led by the king Louis XIII and the Cardinal Richelieu.

== Population ==
Historical population
Year	Pop.	±% p.a.
1968	1,702	—
1975	1,686	−0.13%
1982	1,968	+2.23%
1990	2,306	+2.00%
1999	2,450	+0.68%
2007	2,666	+1.06%
2012	2,938	+1.96%
2017	3,030	+0.62%
2023	3,183	+0.82%
Source: INSEE

== Economy ==
Industry started early in Chomérac, thanks to silk manufacturers (up to 15 silk throwing mills in the 19th century) and the marble quarry, which delivers to the whole region and even abroad.

== See also ==
- Communes of the Ardèche department
