= Beauchastel =

- Commune
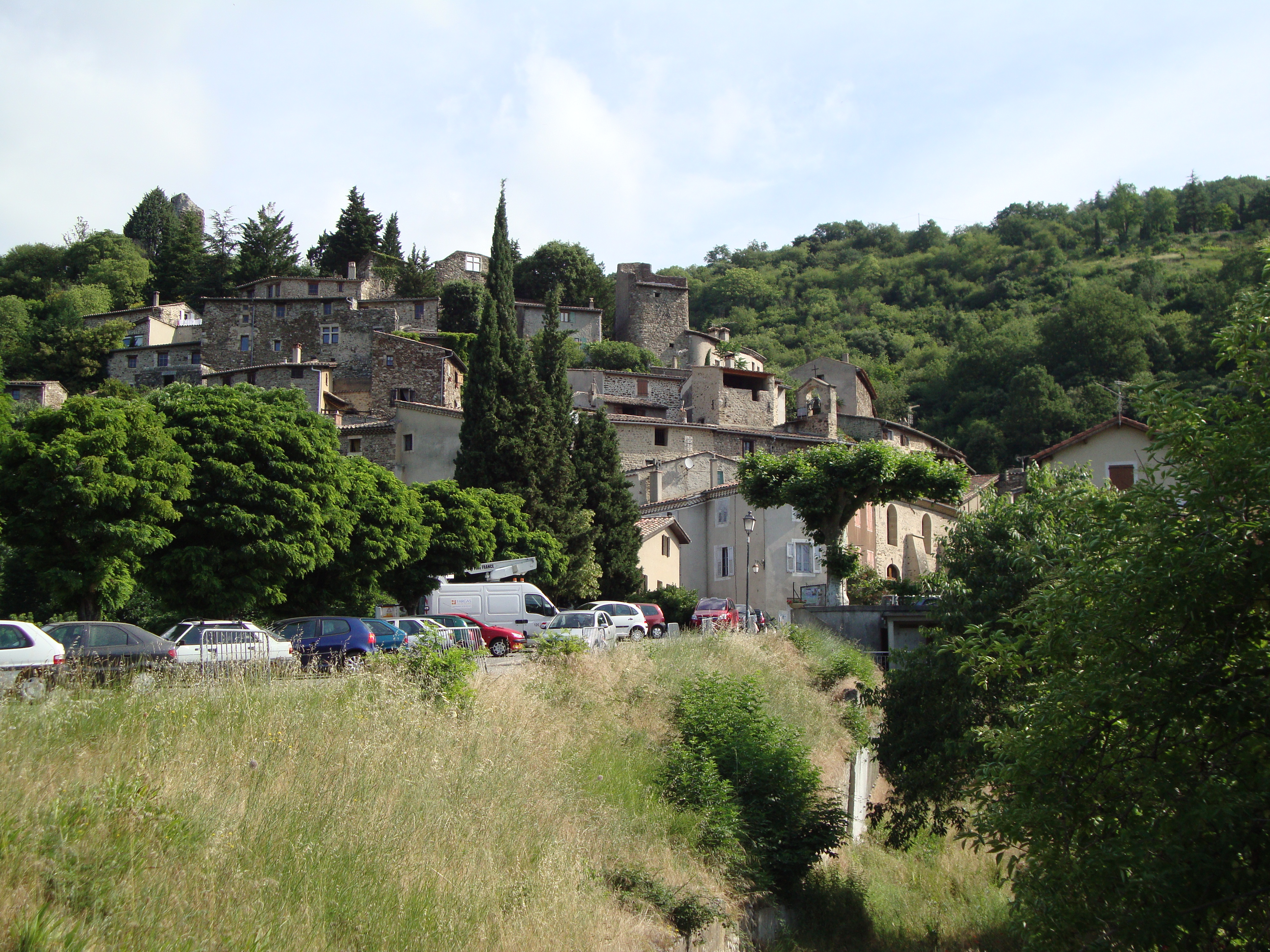
- A general view of Beauchastel
- Location of Beauchastel
- Location within France Location within Auvergne-Rhône-Alpes
- Coordinates: 44°49′36″N 4°48′14″E
- Country: France
- Region: Auvergne-Rhône-Alpes
- Department: Ardèche
- Arrondissement: Privas
- Canton: Rhône-Eyrieux
- Intercommunality: CA Privas Centre Ardèche

Government
  - Mayor (2020–2026): Karine Takes
- Area^{1}: 8.46 km^{2} (3.27 sq mi)
- Elevation: 100 m (330 ft)
- Highest elevation: 560 m (1,840 ft)
- Lowest elevation: 96 m (315 ft)
- Population (2023): 1,800
  - Density: 210/km^{2} (550/sq mi)
- Time zone: UTC+01:00 (CET)
  - Summer (DST): UTC+02:00 (CEST)
- INSEE/Postal code: 07027 /07800
- ^{1} French Land Register data, which excludes lakes, ponds, glaciers > 1 km^{2} (0.386 sq mi or 247 acres) and river estuaries.

Beauchastel (French pronunciation: [boʃastɛl]) is a commune in the Ardèche department in the Auvergne-Rhône-Alpes region of southern France.

The inhabitants of the commune are known as Beauchastellois or Beauchastelloises.

== Geography ==
Beauchastel is located some 10 km south by south-west of Valence and 20 km north-east of Privas. Access to the commune is by the D86 road from Charmes-sur-Rhône in the north which passes through the commune and continues south to La Voulte-sur-Rhône. The D86E branches from the D86 at the northern communal border and goes to the town then continues south to rejoin the D86 at La Voulte-sur-Rhône. The D21 goes west from the town to Saint-Laurent-du-Pape. The east of the commune includes a portion of the Île Saint-Thimé in the Rhône river which is also the departmental border with Drôme. A railway line from Saint-Péray in the north to La Voulte-sur-Rhône in the south passes through the commune but there is no station in the commune. The commune consists of a large urban area along the banks of the Rhône with farmland south of the Eyrieux and forested hills for the rest.

A branch of the Rhône forms the eastern border of the commune with the main branch flowing south through the commune and continuing to eventually joining the sea at Port-Saint-Louis-du-Rhone. The Eyrieux river flows through the commune from the west to join the Rhône just south of the commune. Numerous streams rise in the commune and flow south to feed the Eyrieux including the Ruiseeau de Thouac (which forms the western border of the commune), the Ruisseau d'Abrou, and the Ruisseau de Chauvert. The Ruisseau de Feuillas flows east through the north of the commune to join the Rhône. There is a dam on the main branch of the Rhône with an electricity generating station: the Centrale Electrique de Beauchastel. Beauchastel was often the victim of floods of the Eyrieux, until the construction of a damin the upper reaches of the river in 1860.

== Toponymy ==
Beauchastel appears as Beauchaftel on the 1750 Cassini Map and as Beauchastel on the 1790 version.

== History ==
The commune takes its name from the castle "Bel Castrum" built in the 12th century by the Lords of Retourtour and Briand. Since ravaged by the Wars of religion, all that remains is the fortified tower that dominates the village.

In the 17th and 18th centuries Beauchastel was one of the Royal salt barns for the payment of the Gabelle of salt.

== Administration ==
List of Successive Mayors

From	To	Name
1977	1995	Henri Bouvier
1995	2020	Alain Valla
2020	current	Karine Takes

== Demography ==
Historical population

Year	Pop.	±% p.a.
1793	578	—
1800	487	−2.42%
1806	569	+2.63%
1821	678	+1.18%
1831	817	+1.88%
1836	847	+0.72%
1841	866	+0.44%
1846	840	−0.61%
1851	840	+0.00%
1856	873	+0.77%
1861	845	−0.65%
1866	841	−0.09%
1872	871	+0.59%
1876	1,038	+4.48%
1881	949	−1.78%
1886	896	−1.14%
1891	957	+1.33%
1896	829	−2.83%
1901	796	−0.81%

Year	Pop.	±% p.a.
1906	789	−0.18%
1911	763	−0.67%
1921	807	+0.56%
1926	910	+2.43%
1931	856	−1.22%
1936	840	−0.38%
1946	801	−0.47%
1954	863	+0.94%
1962	1,008	+1.96%
1968	1,064	+0.91%
1975	1,544	+5.46%
1982	1,614	+0.64%
1990	1,462	−1.23%
1999	1,565	+0.76%
2007	1,709	+1.11%
2012	1,747	+0.44%
2017	1,822	+0.84%
2023	1,800	−0.20%

Source: EHESS and INSEE

== Economy ==
- Tourism (medieval village)
- Fish Farming (Eyrieux valley)
- Hydroelectric plant (on a branch of the Rhône)

== Local Culture and Heritage ==
=== Religious Heritage ===
- A Church from the 19th century

=== Sites and Monuments ===
- The Bellum Castrum Medieval village. In 1179 the first lords, Retourtour and Briand, built a tower and ramparts to defend against invaders. The medieval village is built on the site of the old castle. During the Wars of religion the village was destroyed in 1622 by order of Louis XIII and the fortifications of Beauchastel were levelled; the ramparts and the defence towers disappeared. Despite these demolitions the site retained its medieval aspect enriched by architectural elements from the Renaissance until the early 20th century.
- The Ancient Castle dating back to the 12th century overlooks the village. It was limited to a protective Keep with a square base of which only a section of wall remains. It was destroyed together with the village during the wars of religion.
- A Church from the 18th century (1761).
- The Hydroelectric plant on the Rhone

=== Photo gallery ===
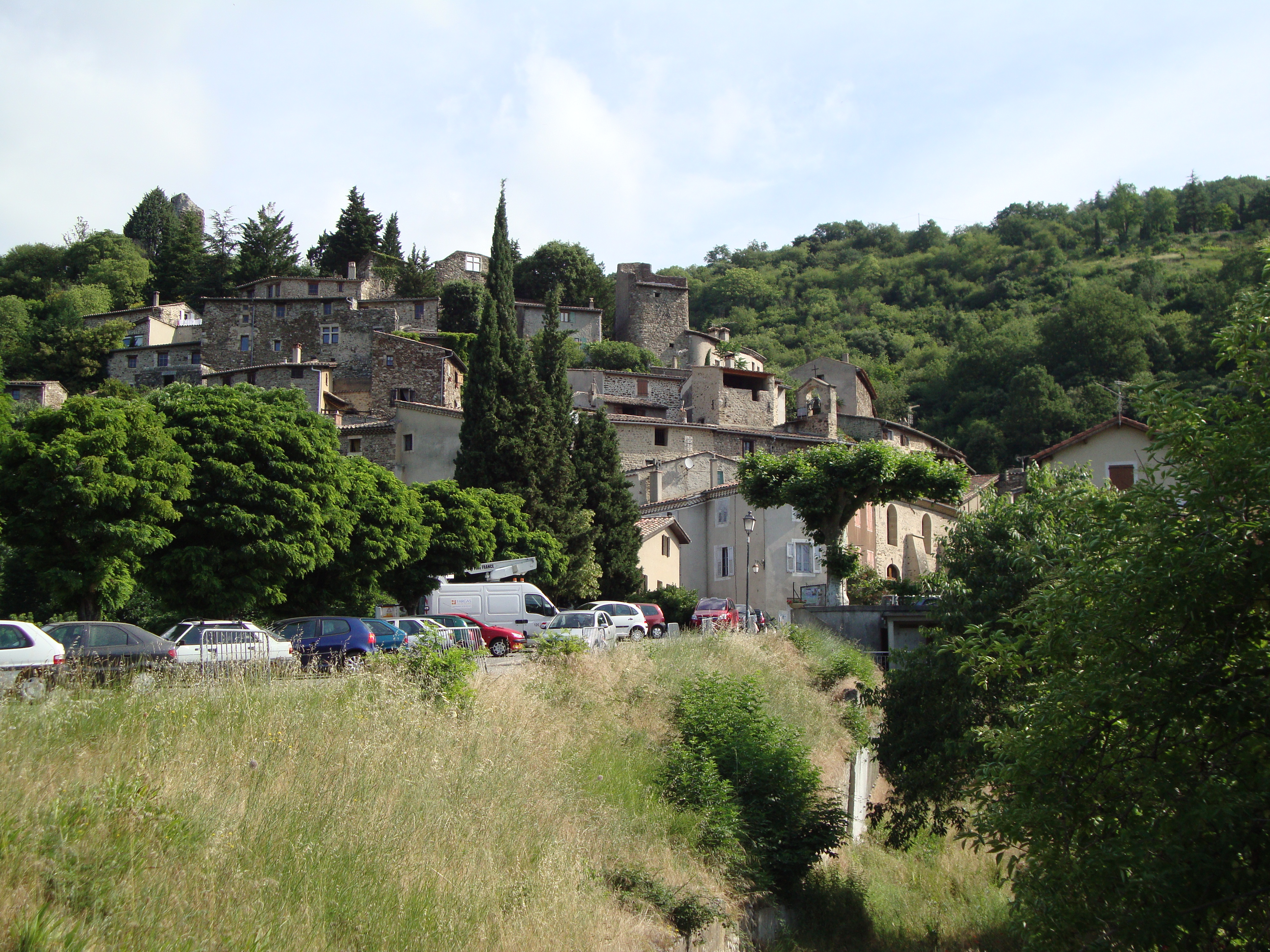
View of the village

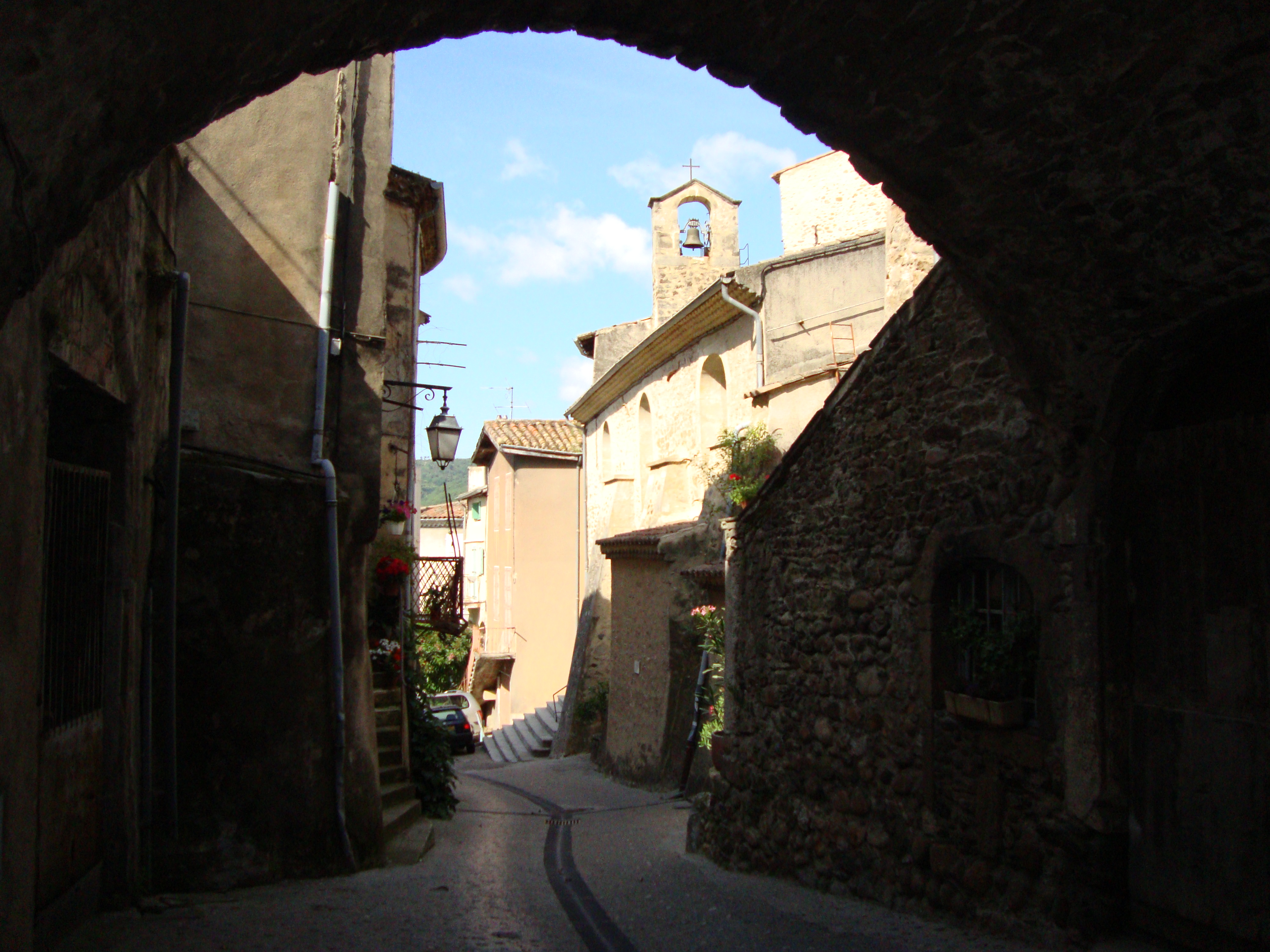
Old village street and church

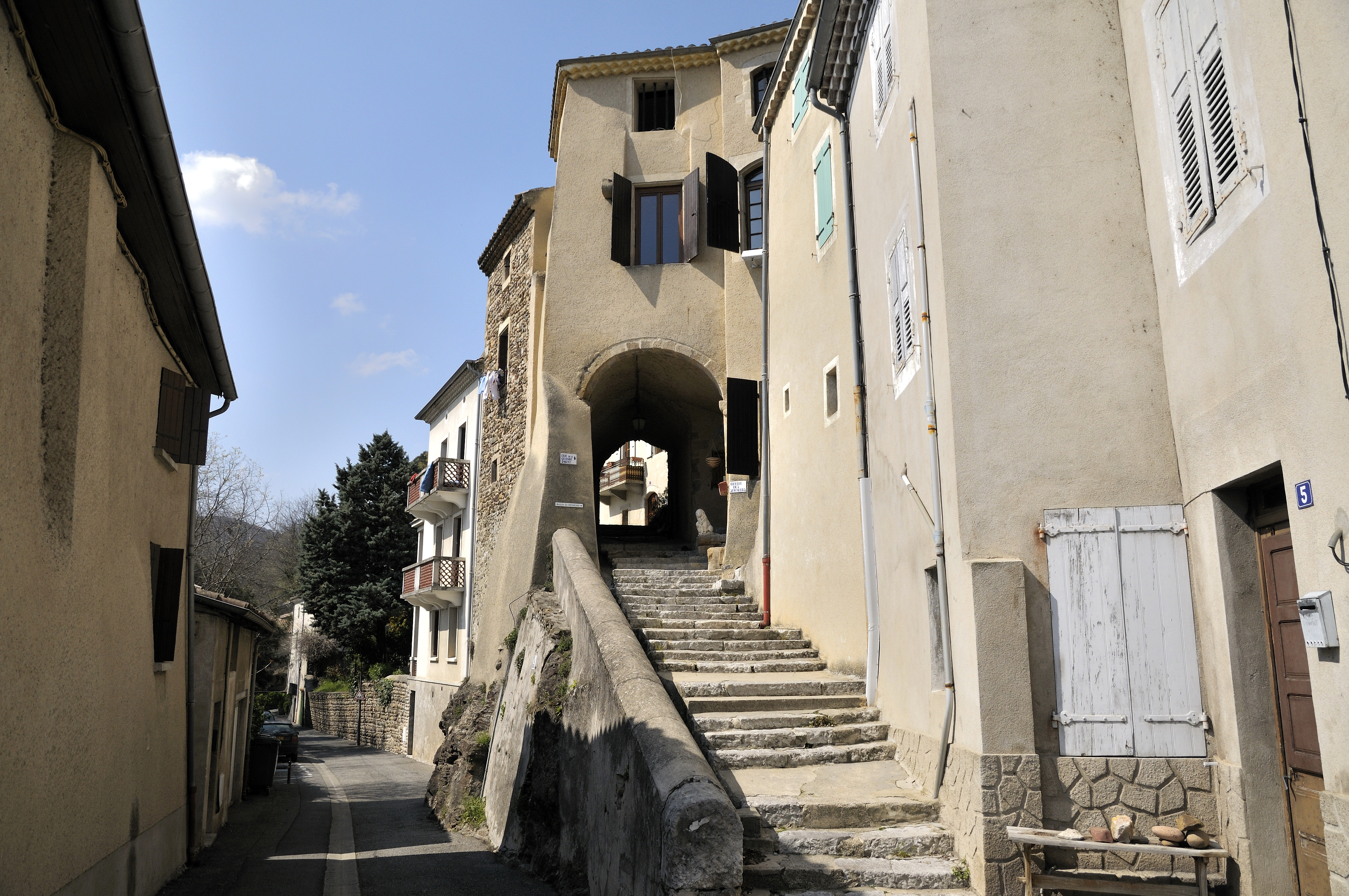
Rue de la grande porte

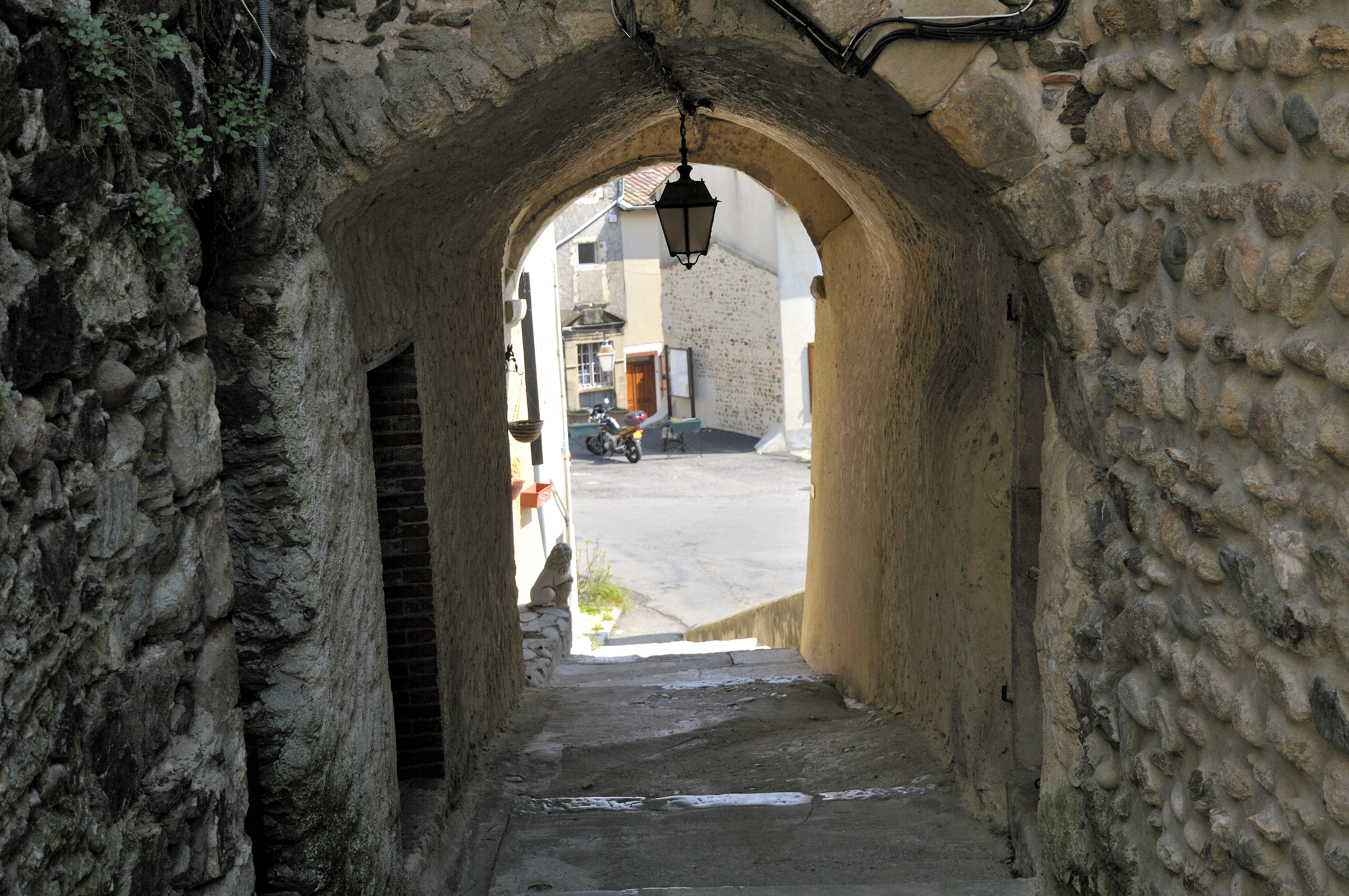
Entry to the village

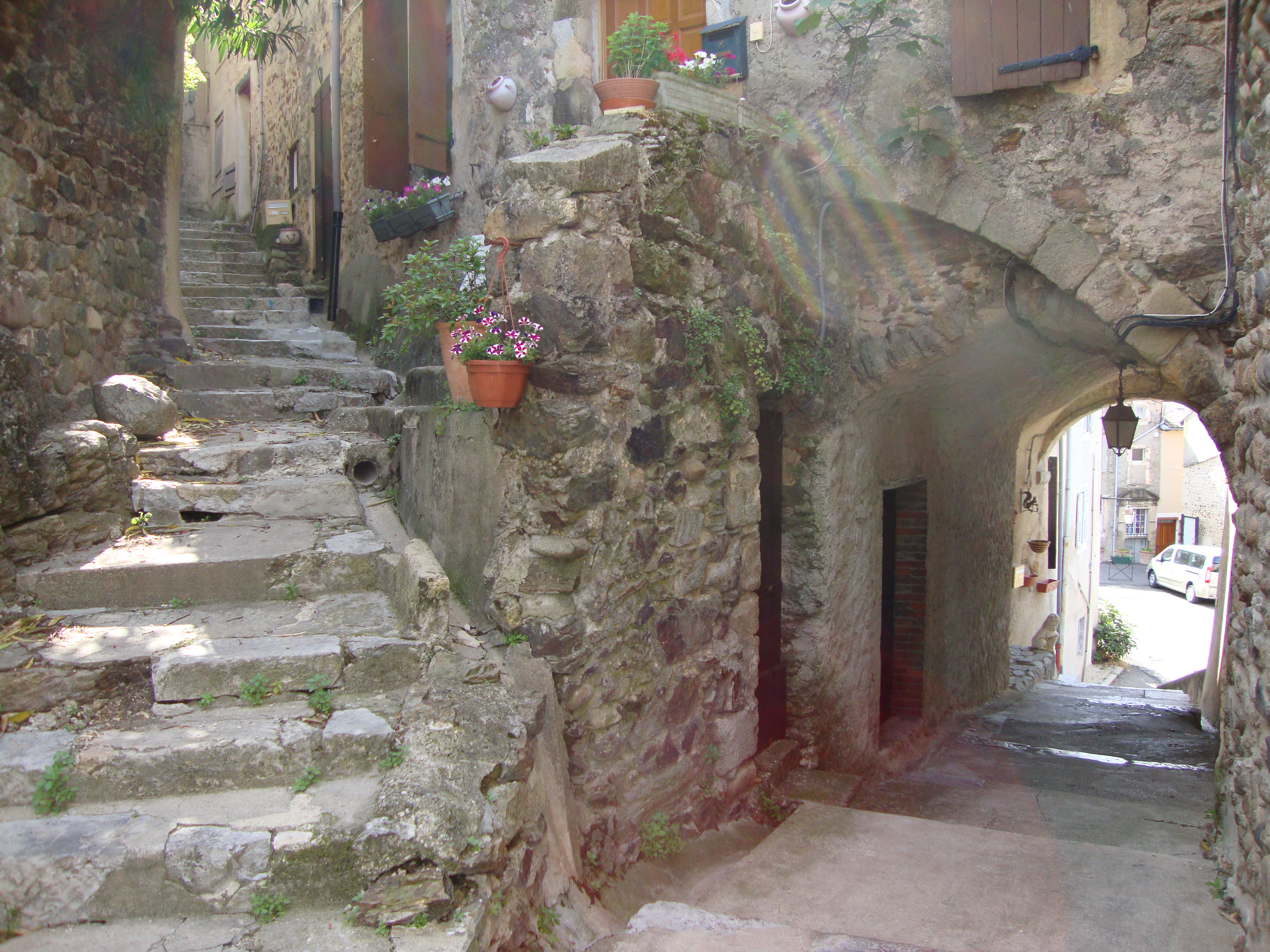
Old village: street and stairs

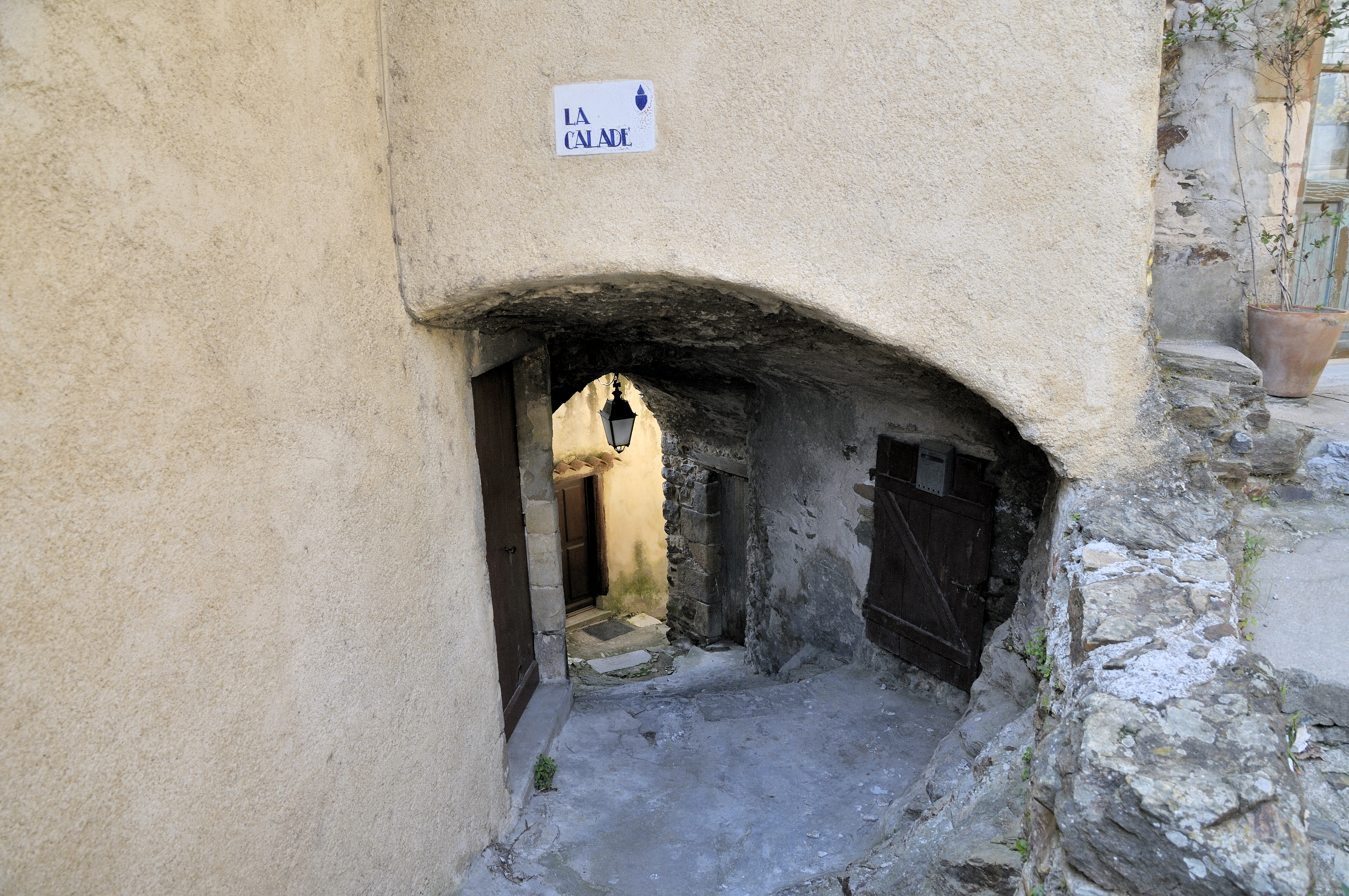
Calade

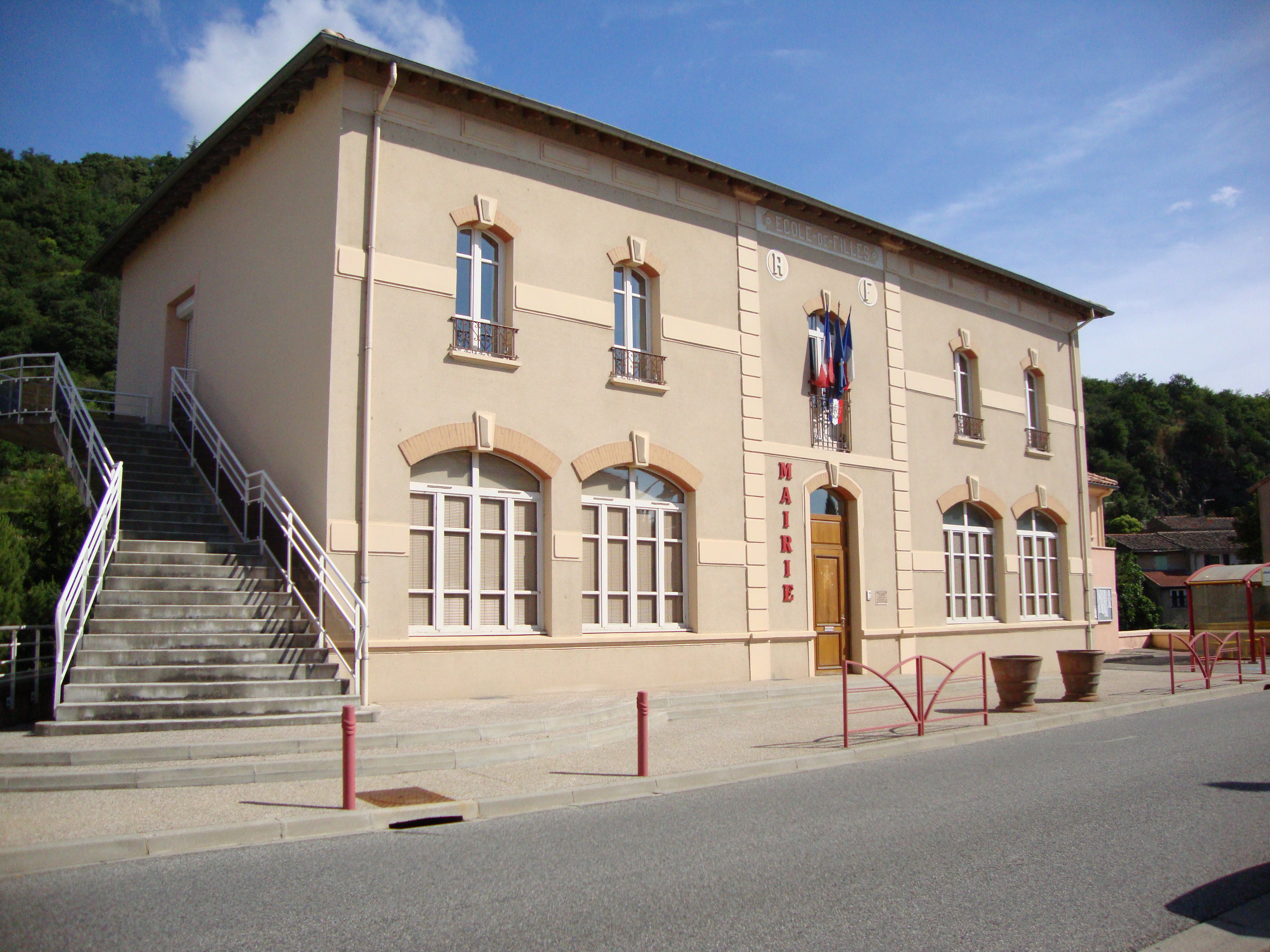
The Town Hall/School

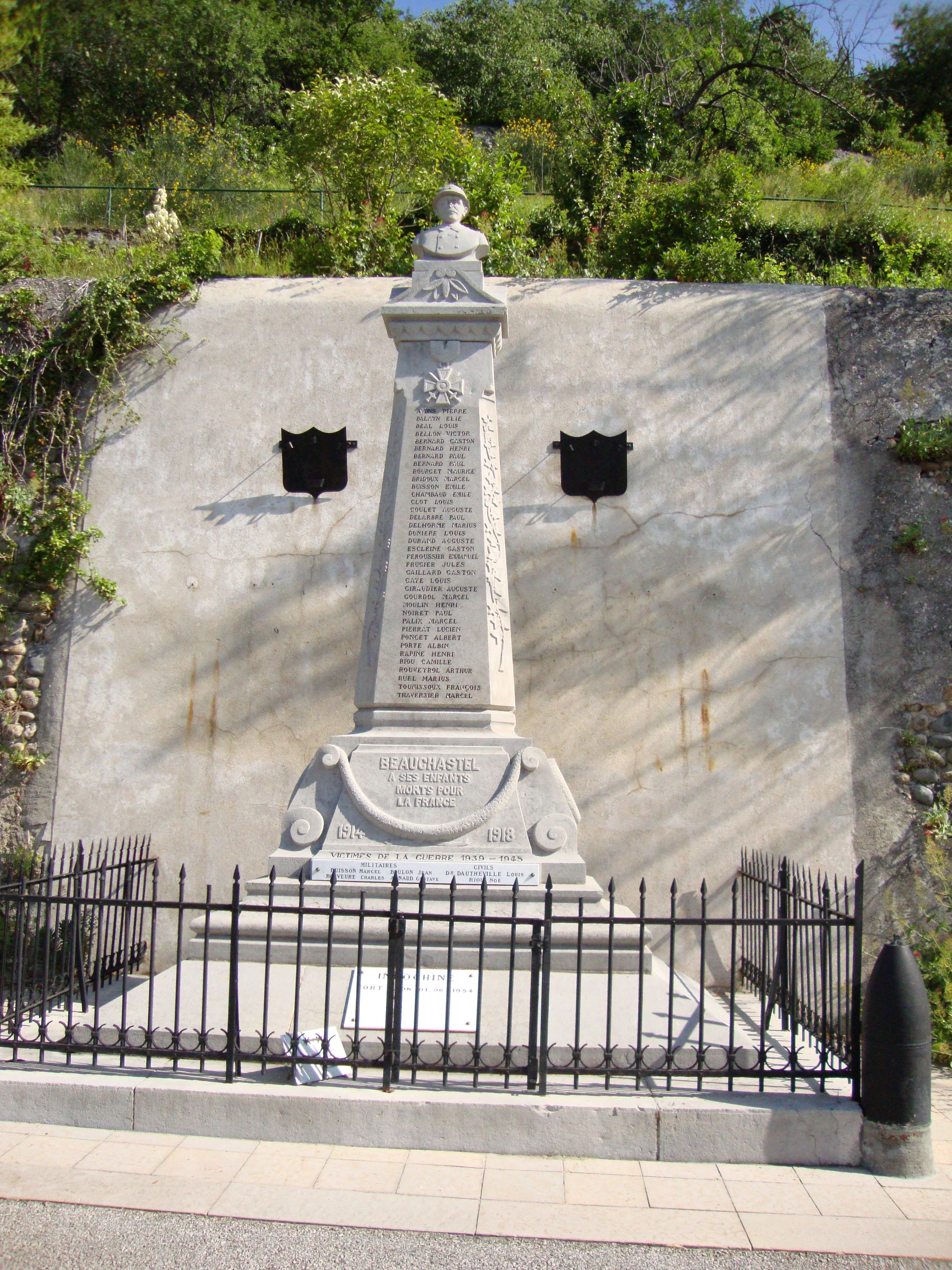
The War memorial

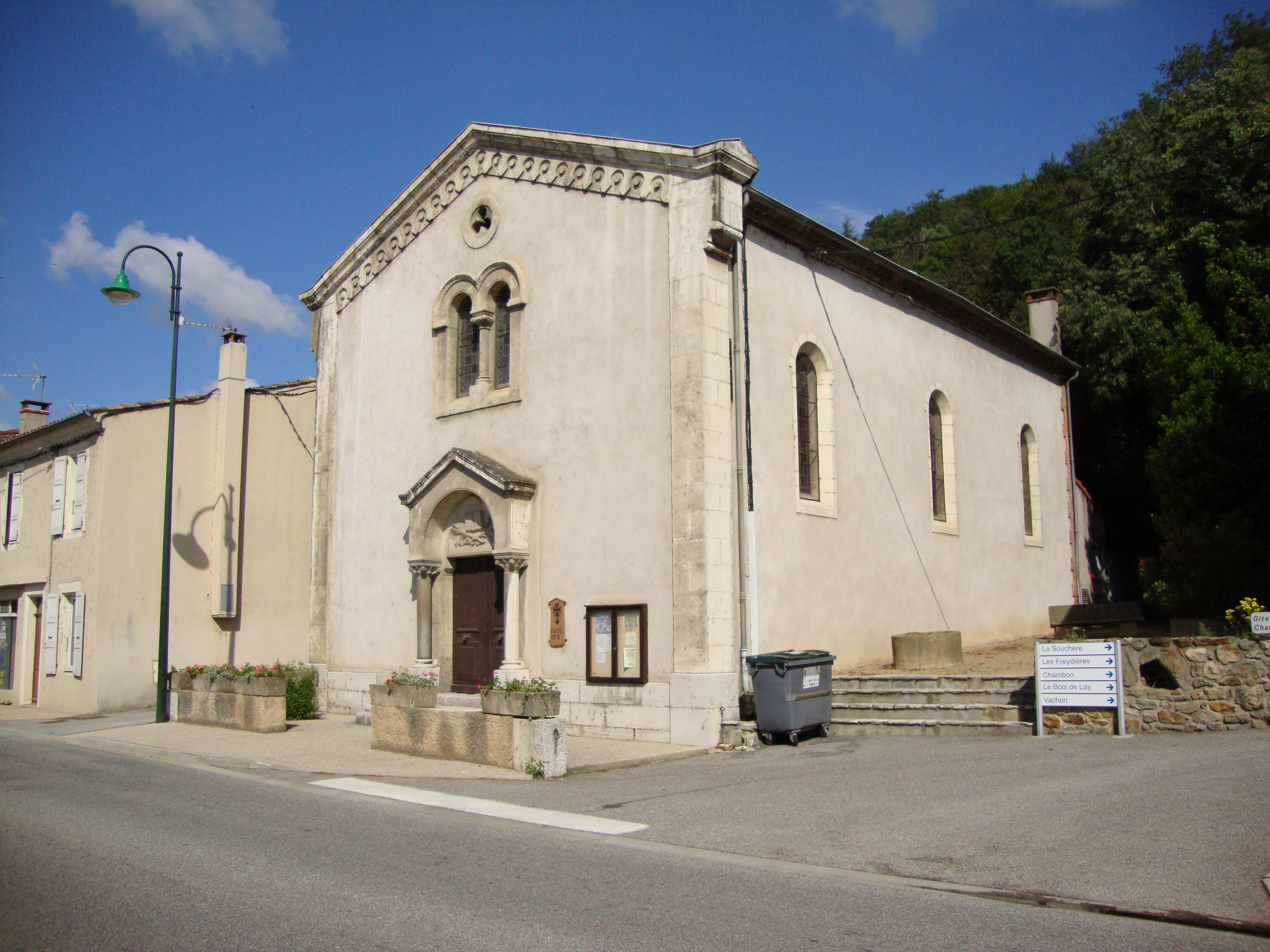
The Protestant Church

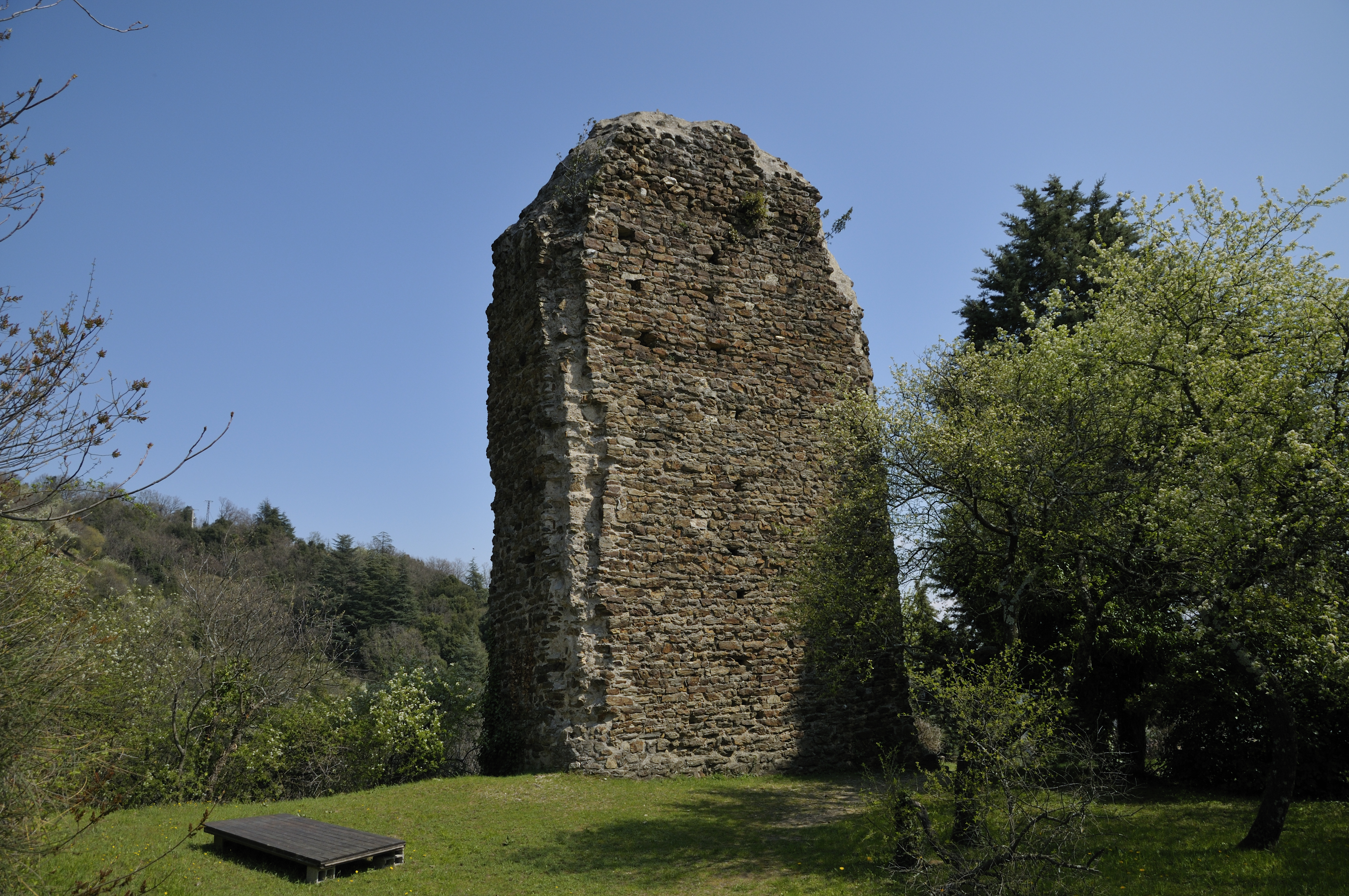
The remains of the Castle

== See also ==
- Communes of the Ardèche department
