= Sollia gens =

Ancient Roman family

The gens Sollia was a minor plebeian family at ancient Rome. Few members of this gens appear in history, of whom the most famous is the fifth-century bishop and scholar Gaius Sollius Modestus Sidonius Apollinaris, a son-in-law of the emperor Avitus.

== Praenomina ==
The main praenomina of the Sollii were Gaius, Marcus, and Lucius, the three most common names at all periods of Roman history. They also used the common praenomina Quintus and Sextus.

== Members ==
This list includes abbreviated praenomina. For an explanation of this practice, see filiation.

- Sollia, the wife and heir of Sollius, for whom she dedicated a monument at the present site of Anglefort, formerly part of Gallia Lugdunensis.
- Sollia, buried at Flavia Solva in Noricum, aged twenty-one, with a monument from her husband, dating to the second century, or the last part of the first.
- Sollius, a potter known by a maker's mark on pottery from Pons Aelius in Britannia.
- Sollius, the son of Matinus, was buried at the site of modern Anglefort, with a monument from his wife, Sollia.
- Lucius Sollius, mentioned in an inscription from Aequum in Dalmatia, dating to AD 121.
- Lucius Sollius, made an offering to Epona at Augusta Raurica in Germania Superior, during the late second or early third century.
- Marcus Sollius, named in an inscription from Pinna in Sabinum, dating to the reign of Caligula.
- Sollia Abdugissa, buried at Augusta Treverorum, along with her husband, Marcus Jovincatius Sumaro.
- Sollia Annia, along with her son, Marinius Claudianus, dedicated a late second- or early third-century monument at Vienna in Gallia Narbonensis to her husband, Lucius Marinius Italicensis.
- Marcus Sollius Atticus, dedicated a second-century monument at Castrum Truentinum in Picenum to his brother, whose name has not been preserved, but who had a distinguished career in public service, as legate of the Legio VII Gemina, praefectus aerarii militaris, and consul.
- Lucius Sollius Calendio, buried at Dea Augusta Vocontiorum in Gallia Narbonensis, with a monument from his wife, Sollia Sabina.
- Sollius Decuminius, made an offering to Jupiter Optimus Maximus and Juno Regina at Nida in Germania Superior, during the latter half of the second century, or the first half of the third.
- Sollia Sex. f. Demostheniana, together with her mother, Theodotia Basilissa, and brother, Sollius Olympiodorus, dedicated a second-century monument at Vienna to her father, Sextus Sollius Demosthenianus.
- Sextus Sollius Demosthenianus, apparently a freedman, buried at Vienna in Gallia Narbonensis during the second century, with a monument dedicated by his wife, Theodotia Basilissa, and his children, Sollia Demostheniana and Sollius Olympiodorus.
- Sollius Eleutherius, along with Thaumastus, probably his foster-father, dedicated a monument at Nemausus in Gallia Narbonensis to his foster-mother, whose name has not been preserved.
- Marcus Sollius Epaphroditus, dedicated a monument at Lugdunum in Gallia Lugdunensis to his friend, Marcus Jucundius Primus Vocontius.
- Sollia Fida, buried in a second-century tomb at Vienna, with a monument from her husband, Titus Cafatius Cosmus, one of the Seviri Augustales.
- Sollia Fortunata, the wife of Gaius Julius Sabinus, with whom she dedicated a second-century monument at Pinna to their son, Gaius Julius Sabinianus, a young physician, aged seventeen years, ten months, and fourteen days.
- Sollius Gallicanus, a soldier and optio custodiarum in the Legio I Adiutrix, serving in the century of Valerius Fronto, at Mogontiacum, between AD 70 and 86.
- Marcus Sollius Zurae f. Gracilis Scordiscus, a native of Pannonia, recognized in a military diploma dating from AD 139.
- Marcus Sollius Marcellus, buried at Gratianopolis in Gallia Narbonensis, leaving Gaius Sollius Verus as his heir.
- Gaius Sollius C. f. Marculus, a librarius, or copyist, buried at Gratianopolis, aged twenty-six, with a monument dating to the latter half of the third century, dedicated by his father, Gaius Sollius Marcus, sisters, Attia Marciana and Marcula, and wife, Attia Aurelia.
- Gaius Sollius Marcus, along with his daughters, Attia Marciana and Marcula, and daughter-in-law, Attia Aurelia, dedicated a monument at Gratianopolis to his son, Gaius Sollius Marculus, dating to the latter half of the third century.
- Gaius Sollius Modestus Sidonius Apollinaris, the son-in-law of Avitus, was a bishop and man of letters during the fifth century. A member of a prominent family of Lugdunum, Apollinaris' numerous letters and panegyrics on the emperors of his time are an important source for the history of this period.
- Sollius Sex. f. Olympiodorus, along with his mother, Theodotia Basilissa, and sister, Sollia Demostheniana, dedicated a second-century monument at Vienna in Gallia Narbonensis to his father, Sextus Sollius Demosthenianus.
- Gaius Sollius Optatus, along with his son, Sollius Siro, made an offering at Carnuntum in Pannonia Superior to Jupiter Optimus Maximus Dolichenus, under the supervision of the priest Antonius, during the latter half of the second century, or the first half of the third.
- Quintus Sollius Primus, buried at Scupi in Moesia Superior, aged twenty-three, during the latter half of the second century, or the first half of the third, with a monument from his grandfather, Quintus Sollius Surus.
- Sollia Sabina, dedicated a tomb at Dea Augusta Vocontiorum for her husband, Lucius Sollius Calendio.
- Gaius Sollius Saturninus, made an offering to the local goddesses at the present site of Morken, formerly part of Germania Inferior.
- Lucius Sollius L. f. Secundio, a native of Ticinum in Cisalpine Gaul, dedicated a sepulchre at Verona in Venetia and Histria for himself and his wife, Pailonia Maxima.
- Sollius C. f. Siro, along with his father, Gaius Sollius Surus, made a second- or third-century offering to Jupiter Optimus Maximus at Carnuntum.
- Quintus Sollius Surus, dedicate a second- or third-century monument at Scupi to his grandson, Quintus Sollius Primus.
- Sollia Ursa, buried at Valentia in Gallia Narbonensis, with a monument from her husband, Julius Severus.
- Lucius Sollius Ursio, dedicated a monument at Rome for his wife, Claudia Primitiva, aged thirty-seven.
- Gaius Sollius Verus, the heir of Marcus Sollius Marcellus, for whom he dedicated a monument at Gratianopolis.
- Sollius Vico, buried in a second- or third-century tomb at Orolaunum in Gallia Belgica, along with Similia, perhaps his wife.

== See also ==
- List of Roman gentes

== Bibliography ==
- Theodor Mommsen et alii, Corpus Inscriptionum Latinarum (The Body of Latin Inscriptions, abbreviated CIL), Berlin-Brandenburgische Akademie der Wissenschaften (1853–present).
- René Cagnat et alii, L'Année épigraphique (The Year in Epigraphy, abbreviated AE), Presses Universitaires de France (1888–present).
- August Pauly, Georg Wissowa, et alii, Realencyclopädie der Classischen Altertumswissenschaft (Scientific Encyclopedia of the Knowledge of Classical Antiquities, abbreviated RE or PW), J. B. Metzler, Stuttgart (1894–1980).
- Paul von Rohden, Elimar Klebs, & Hermann Dessau, Prosopographia Imperii Romani (The Prosopography of the Roman Empire, abbreviated PIR), Berlin (1898).
- Herbert Nesselhauf and Hans Lieb, "Dritter Nachtrag zu CIL XIII: Inschriften aus den germanischen Provinzen und dem Treverergebiet" (Third Addendum to CIL XIII: Inscriptions from the Germanic Provinces and the Region of the Treveri), in Berichte der Römisch-Germanischen Kommission, vol. 40, pp. 120–228 (1959).
