= Les Ollières-sur-Eyrieux =

- Commune
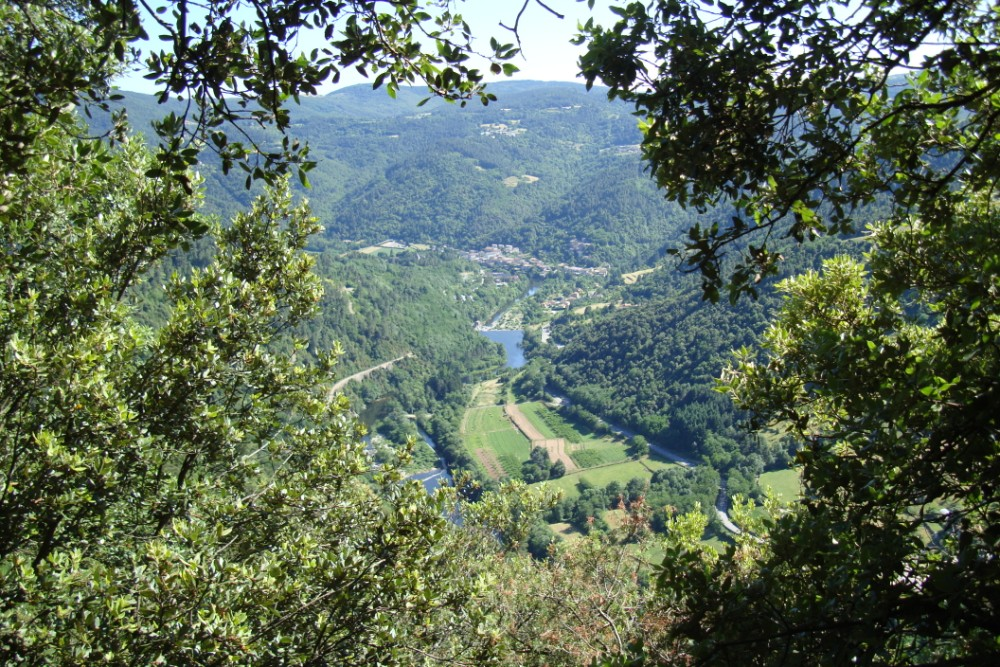
- A view towards Les Ollières-sur-Eyrieux
- Location of Les Ollières-sur-Eyrieux
- Location within France Location within Auvergne-Rhône-Alpes
- Coordinates: 44°48′23″N 4°37′19″E
- Country: France
- Region: Auvergne-Rhône-Alpes
- Department: Ardèche
- Arrondissement: Privas
- Canton: Haut-Eyrieux
- Intercommunality: CA Privas Centre Ardèche

Government
  - Mayor (2020–2026): Hélène Baptiste
- Area^{1}: 7.58 km^{2} (2.93 sq mi)
- Highest elevation: 400 m (1,300 ft)
- Lowest elevation: 157 m (515 ft)
- Population (2023): 1,031
  - Density: 136/km^{2} (352/sq mi)
- Time zone: UTC+01:00 (CET)
  - Summer (DST): UTC+02:00 (CEST)
- INSEE/Postal code: 07167 /07360
- ^{1} French Land Register data, which excludes lakes, ponds, glaciers > 1 km^{2} (0.386 sq mi or 247 acres) and river estuaries.

Les Ollières-sur-Eyrieux (French pronunciation: [le.z‿ɔljɛʁ syʁ eʁjø], literally Les Ollières on Eyrieux; Occitan: Las Olièras) is a commune in the Ardèche department in southern France.

The nearest towns are Privas and Saint-Sauveur-de-Montagut.

== History ==
The first records of a settlement can be dated back to the 12th century. Situated on the banks of the river Eyrieux (a tributary to the Rhône), Les Ollières (as it is often shortened to by the local people) became a central location for the treatment and processing of silk in the early 18th century. The silk (and later different textiles) industry was to feature heavily in the surrounding area.

=== 21st century ===
The village has now become a tourist location, attracting many Dutch, German, Swiss and English tourists to its many camp sites during the summer months. Some tourists have started to renovate old cottages and set up permanent or holiday homes in the area.

== Population ==
Historical population
Year	Pop.	±% p.a.
1968	960	—
1975	788	−2.78%
1982	793	+0.09%
1990	769	−0.38%
1999	797	+0.40%
2007	898	+1.50%
2012	946	+1.05%
2017	990	+0.91%
2023	1,031	+0.68%
Source: INSEE

== Transportation ==
For the people of Les Ollières a daily bus service runs to Valence and Privas.

== See also ==
- Communes of the Ardèche department
