= Château de la Tourrette =

Castle ruins in Ardèche, France

Coordinates: 44°52′26″N 4°39′17″E

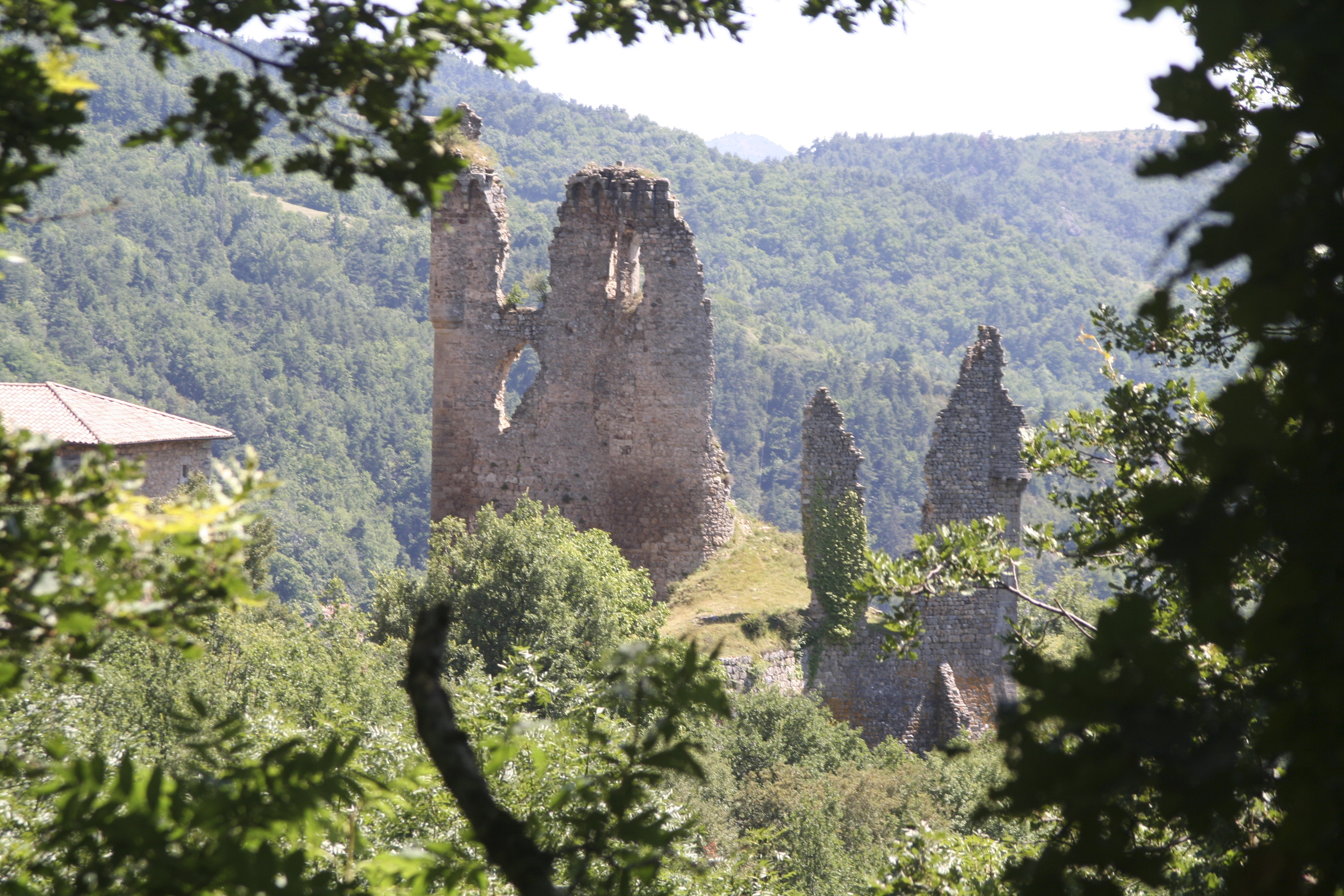
Château de la Tourette

The ruins of the Château de la Tourette are in the commune of Vernoux-en-Vivarais in the Ardèche département of France. It dates from the 14th century.

== Protection ==
The remains of the castle, and notably its square keep, were listed as a monuments historique in 1996, at the same time as a fortified house on the same property constructed in the 15th and 16th centuries.

== See also ==
- List of castles in France
