= Châteauneuf-de-Vernoux =

Châteauneuf-de-Vernoux Chastelnòu de Vernós (Occitan)
- Commune
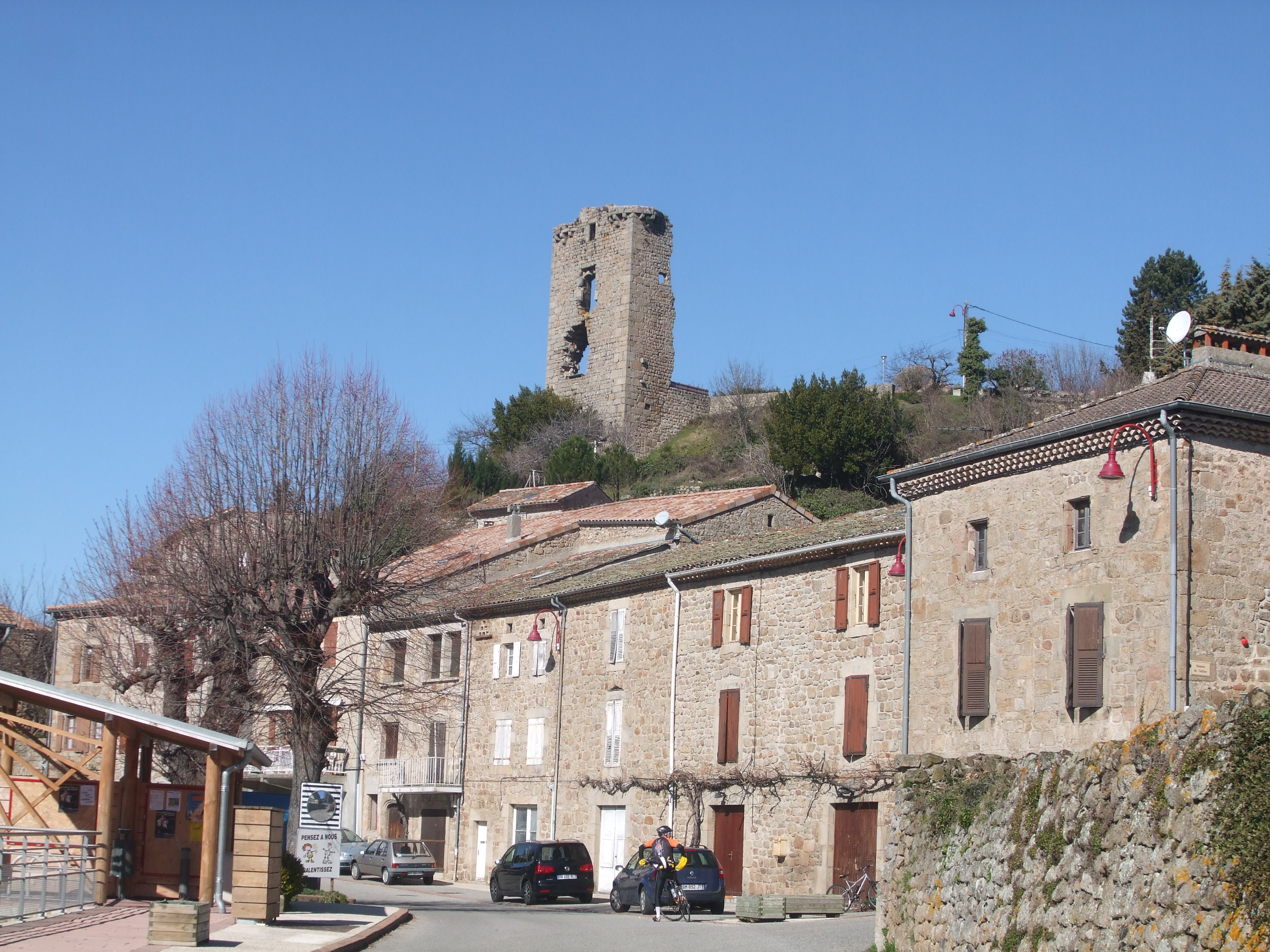
- Village view
- Location of Châteauneuf-de-Vernoux
- Location within France Location within Auvergne-Rhône-Alpes
- Coordinates: 44°55′12″N 4°38′46″E
- Country: France
- Region: Auvergne-Rhône-Alpes
- Department: Ardèche
- Arrondissement: Privas
- Canton: Rhône-Eyrieux
- Intercommunality: CA Privas Centre Ardèche

Government
  - Mayor (2020–2026): Christian Alibert
- Area^{1}: 6.07 km^{2} (2.34 sq mi)
- Elevation: 600 m (2,000 ft)
- Highest elevation: 949 m (3,114 ft)
- Lowest elevation: 555 m (1,821 ft)
- Population (2023): 288
  - Density: 47.4/km^{2} (123/sq mi)
- Time zone: UTC+01:00 (CET)
  - Summer (DST): UTC+02:00 (CEST)
- INSEE/Postal code: 07060 /07240
- ^{1} French Land Register data, which excludes lakes, ponds, glaciers > 1 km^{2} (0.386 sq mi or 247 acres) and river estuaries.

Châteauneuf-de-Vernoux (French: [ʃɑtonœf də vɛʁnu]; Occitan: Chastelnòu de Vernós) is a rural commune in the Ardèche department in the Auvergne-Rhône-Alpes region in southern France. It is located just north of Vernoux-en-Vivarais, after which it is named; its name translates to "new castle of Vernoux".

== Population ==
Historical population
Year	Pop.	±% p.a.
1968	227	—
1975	170	−4.05%
1982	188	+1.45%
1990	198	+0.65%
1999	188	−0.57%
2007	194	+0.39%
2012	215	+2.08%
2017	249	+2.98%
2023	288	+2.45%
Source: INSEE

== See also ==
- Communes of the Ardèche department
