= Beauvène =

- Commune
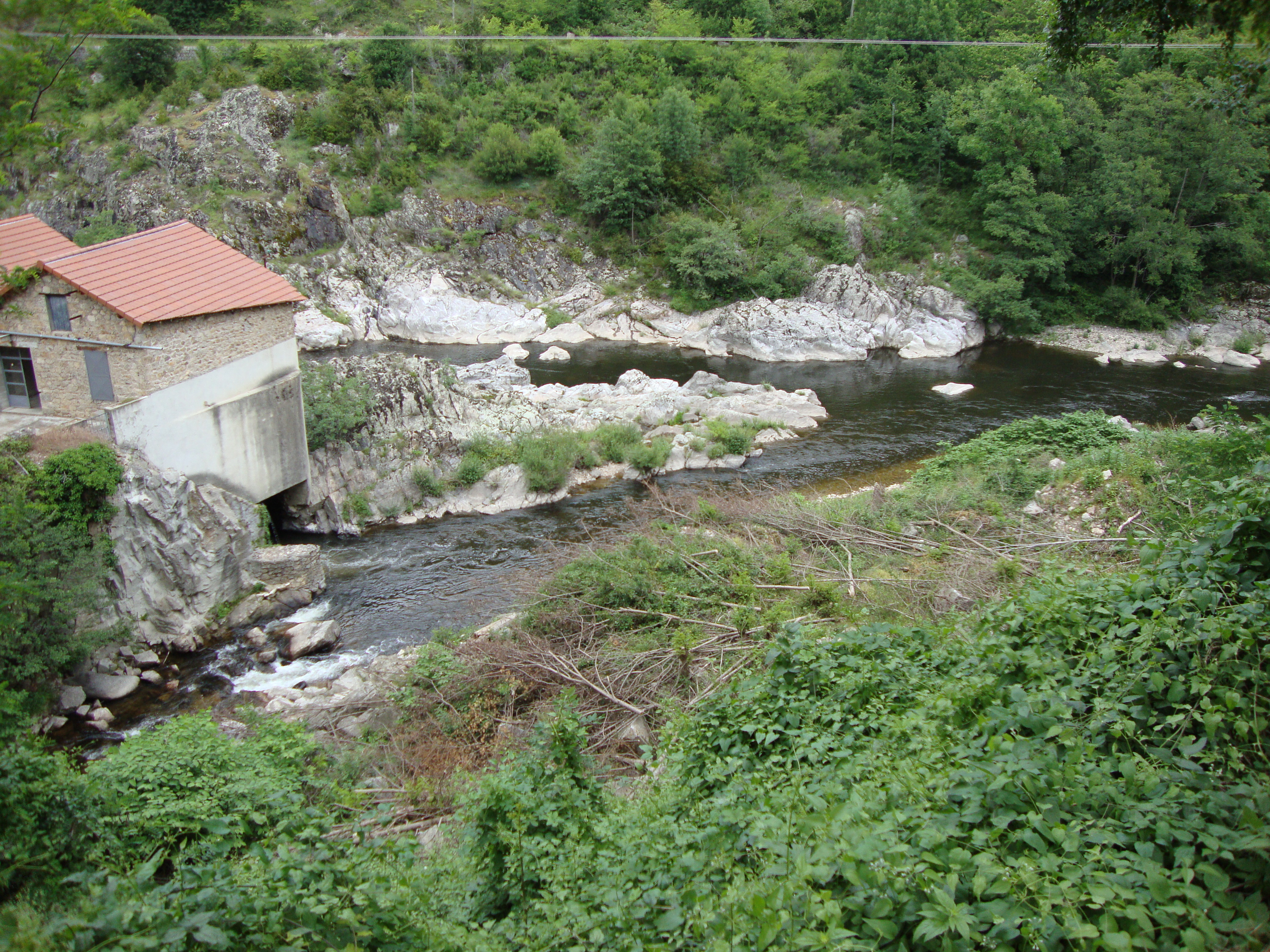
- The river Eyrieux at Beauvène
- Location of Beauvène
- Location within France Location within Auvergne-Rhône-Alpes
- Coordinates: 44°52′40″N 4°30′38″E
- Country: France
- Region: Auvergne-Rhône-Alpes
- Department: Ardèche
- Arrondissement: Privas
- Canton: Haut-Eyrieux
- Intercommunality: CA Privas Centre Ardèche

Government
  - Mayor (2020–2026): Laetitia Serre
- Area^{1}: 11.82 km^{2} (4.56 sq mi)
- Elevation: 400 m (1,300 ft)
- Highest elevation: 1,051 m (3,448 ft)
- Lowest elevation: 273 m (896 ft)
- Population (2023): 204
  - Density: 17.3/km^{2} (44.7/sq mi)
- Time zone: UTC+01:00 (CET)
  - Summer (DST): UTC+02:00 (CEST)
- INSEE/Postal code: 07030 /07190
- ^{1} French Land Register data, which excludes lakes, ponds, glaciers > 1 km^{2} (0.386 sq mi or 247 acres) and river estuaries.

Beauvène (French pronunciation: [bovɛn]; Occitan: Beauvène) is a commune in the Ardèche department in southern France.

== Population ==
Historical population
Year	Pop.	±% p.a.
1968	332	—
1975	247	−4.14%
1982	232	−0.89%
1990	221	−0.61%
1999	220	−0.05%
2007	230	+0.56%
2012	240	+0.85%
2017	210	−2.64%
2023	204	−0.48%
Source: INSEE

== See also ==
- Communes of the Ardèche department
