= Silhac =

- Commune
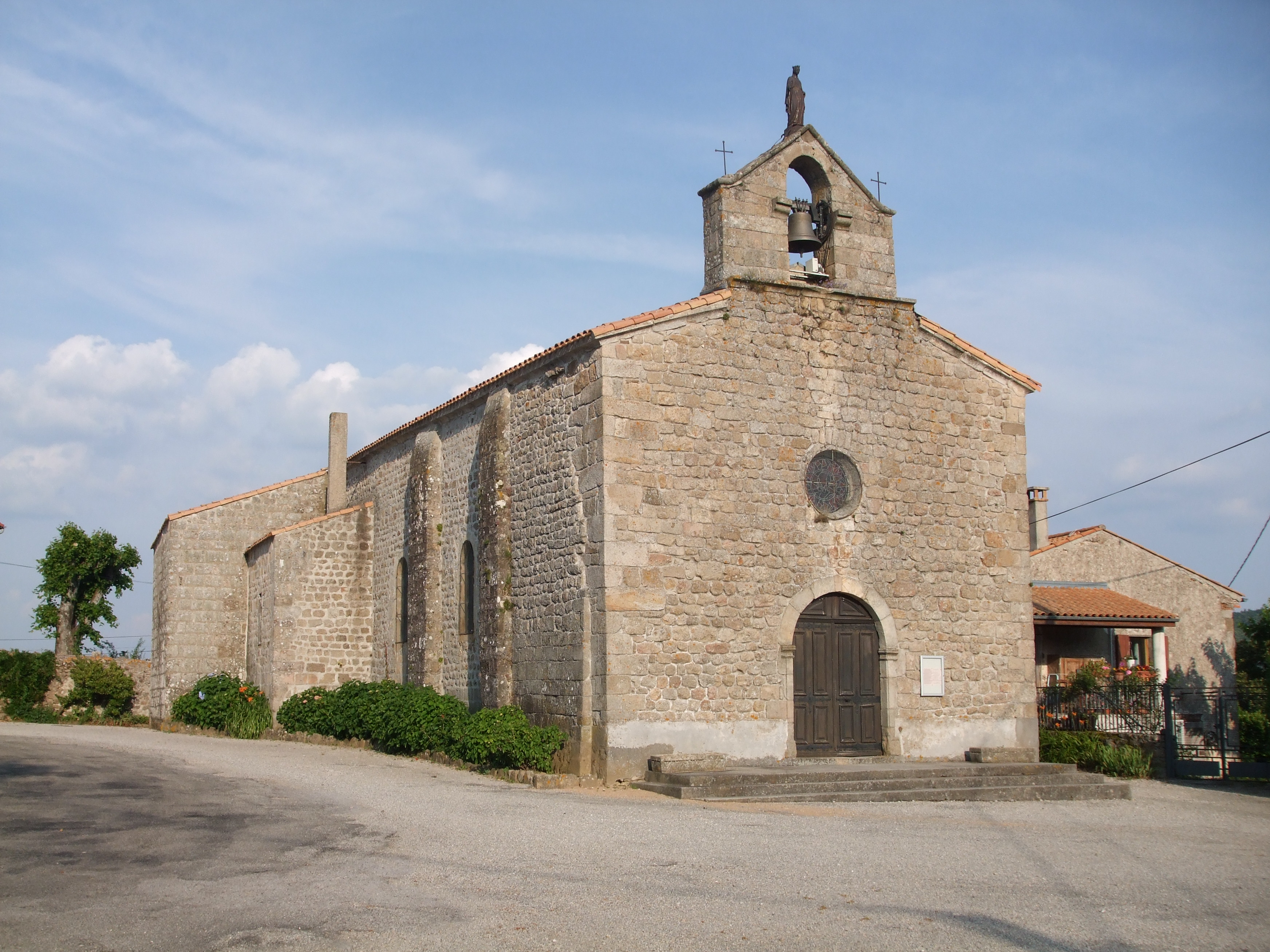
- Church of Our Lady of the Assumption
- Location of Silhac
- Location within France Location within Auvergne-Rhône-Alpes
- Coordinates: 44°52′56″N 4°36′27″E
- Country: France
- Region: Auvergne-Rhône-Alpes
- Department: Ardèche
- Arrondissement: Privas
- Canton: Rhône-Eyrieux
- Intercommunality: CA Privas Centre Ardèche

Government
  - Mayor (2020–2026): Philippe Gibaud
- Area^{1}: 22.71 km^{2} (8.77 sq mi)
- Elevation: 600 m (2,000 ft)
- Highest elevation: 880 m (2,890 ft)
- Lowest elevation: 270 m (890 ft)
- Population (2023): 407
  - Density: 17.9/km^{2} (46.4/sq mi)
- Time zone: UTC+01:00 (CET)
  - Summer (DST): UTC+02:00 (CEST)
- INSEE/Postal code: 07314 /07240
- ^{1} French Land Register data, which excludes lakes, ponds, glaciers > 1 km^{2} (0.386 sq mi or 247 acres) and river estuaries.

Silhac is a commune in the Ardèche department in the Auvergne-Rhône-Alpes region of southern France.

== Geography ==
=== Climate ===
In 2010, the climate of the commune was an altered Mediterranean climate type, according to a French National Centre for Scientific Research study based on a series of data covering the period 1971–2000. The average annual temperature is 10.3 °C, with an annual temperature range of 17 °C . The average annual cumulative precipitation is 1,048 mm, with 7.7 days of precipitation in January and 5.4 days in July.

In 2020, Météo-France published a typology of the climates of metropolitan France in which the commune is in classified as a transition zone between the mountain climate and the Mediterranean climate and is in the Middle Rhône Valley climatic region. The region is characterized by good sunshine in the summer (fraction of insolation > 60%), a high annual temperature amplitude (4 to 20 °C), dry air in all seasons, stormy in summer, strong winds (mistral), and high rainfall in autumn (250 to 300 mm).

=== Hydrography ===
The Dunière, a 24 km watercourse which runs alongside the municipal territory, is a tributary of the Eyrieux, a river which borders the southern part of its territory.

== Administration ==
The municipal council of Silhac, a commune of less than 1,000 inhabitants, is elected by a two-round plurinominal majority vote with isolated or grouped candidacies and the possibility of mixing.

== Population ==
Historical population
Year	Pop.	±% p.a.
1968	487	—
1975	353	−4.49%
1982	337	−0.66%
1990	286	−2.03%
1999	312	+0.97%
2007	342	+1.15%
2012	370	+1.59%
2017	368	−0.11%
2023	407	+1.69%
Source: INSEE

== See also ==
- Communes of the Ardèche department
