= Toulaud =

- Commune
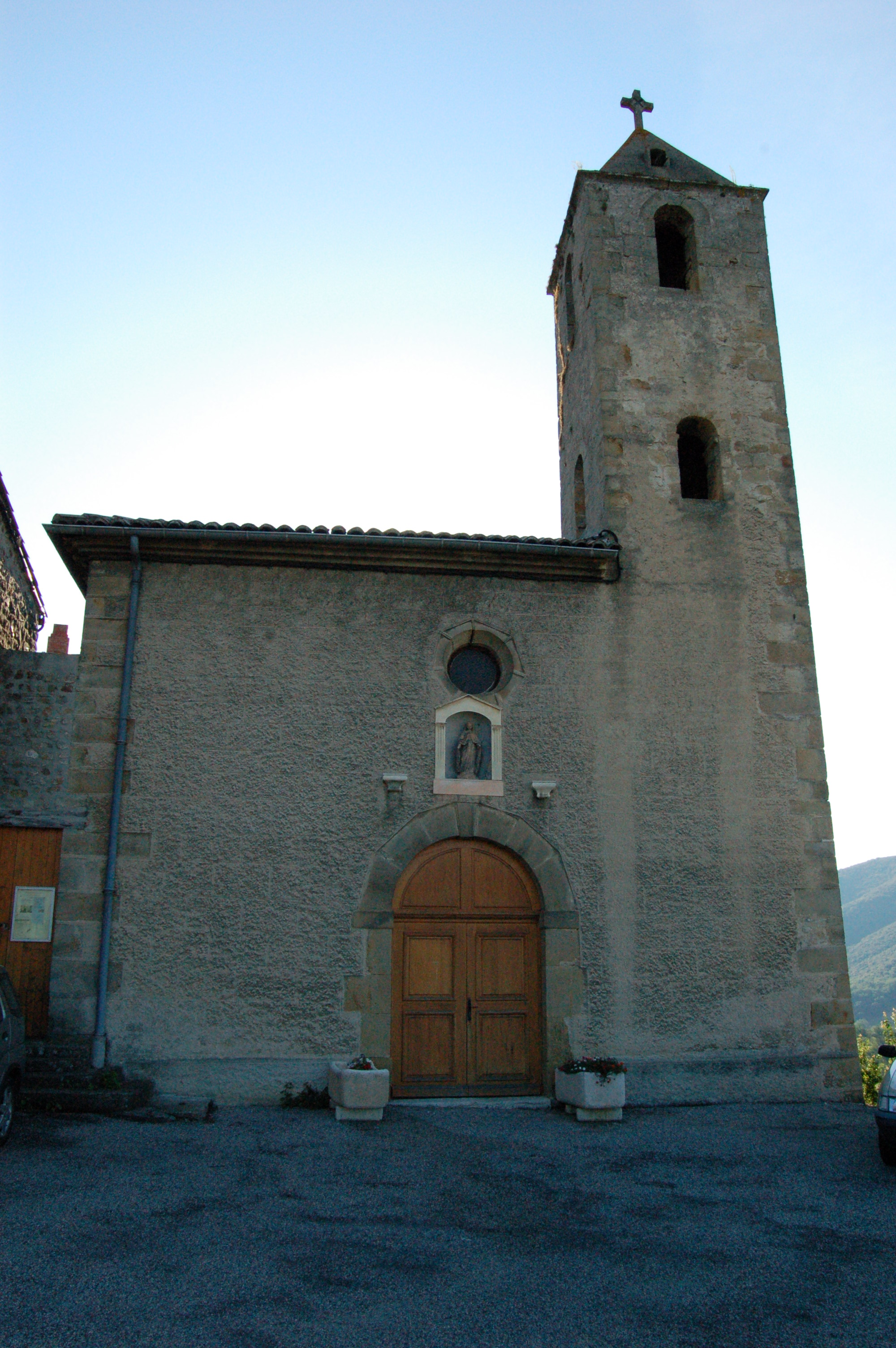
- The church in Toulaud
- Location of Toulaud
- Location within France Location within Auvergne-Rhône-Alpes
- Coordinates: 44°53′55″N 4°49′02″E
- Country: France
- Region: Auvergne-Rhône-Alpes
- Department: Ardèche
- Arrondissement: Tournon-sur-Rhône
- Canton: Rhône-Eyrieux
- Intercommunality: Rhône Crussol

Government
  - Mayor (2020–2026): Christophe Chantre
- Area^{1}: 34.73 km^{2} (13.41 sq mi)
- Elevation: 250 m (820 ft)
- Highest elevation: 631 m (2,070 ft)
- Lowest elevation: 150 m (490 ft)
- Population (2023): 1,687
  - Density: 48.57/km^{2} (125.8/sq mi)
- Time zone: UTC+01:00 (CET)
  - Summer (DST): UTC+02:00 (CEST)
- INSEE/Postal code: 07323 /07130
- ^{1} French Land Register data, which excludes lakes, ponds, glaciers > 1 km^{2} (0.386 sq mi or 247 acres) and river estuaries.

Toulaud (French pronunciation: [tulo]) is a commune in the Ardèche department in southern France.

== Population ==
Historical population
Year	Pop.	±% p.a.
1968	751	—
1975	731	−0.38%
1982	875	+2.60%
1990	1,256	+4.62%
1999	1,501	+2.00%
2007	1,675	+1.38%
2012	1,662	−0.16%
2017	1,700	+0.45%
2023	1,687	−0.13%
Source: INSEE

== See also ==
- Communes of the Ardèche department
