= Canton of Rhône-Eyrieux =

Coordinates: 44.80°N 4.78°E

- Canton
- Situation of the canton of Rhône-Eyrieux in the department of Ardèche
- Country: France
- Region: Auvergne-Rhône-Alpes
- Department: Ardèche
- No. of communes: {{{nbcomm}}}
- Population (2023): 22,978
- INSEE code: 0717

The canton of Rhône-Eyrieux (before 2016: canton of La Voulte-sur-Rhône) is an administrative division of the Ardèche department, southern France. Its borders were modified at the French canton reorganisation which came into effect in March 2015. Its seat is in La Voulte-sur-Rhône.

It consists of the following communes:

1. Beauchastel
2. Boffres
3. Charmes-sur-Rhône
4. Châteauneuf-de-Vernoux
5. Gilhac-et-Bruzac
6. Saint-Apollinaire-de-Rias
7. Saint-Cierge-la-Serre
8. Saint-Fortunat-sur-Eyrieux
9. Saint-Georges-les-Bains
10. Saint-Jean-Chambre
11. Saint-Julien-le-Roux
12. Saint-Laurent-du-Pape
13. Silhac
14. Soyons
15. Toulaud
16. Vernoux-en-Vivarais
17. La Voulte-sur-Rhône
