= Saint-Georges-les-Bains =

- Commune
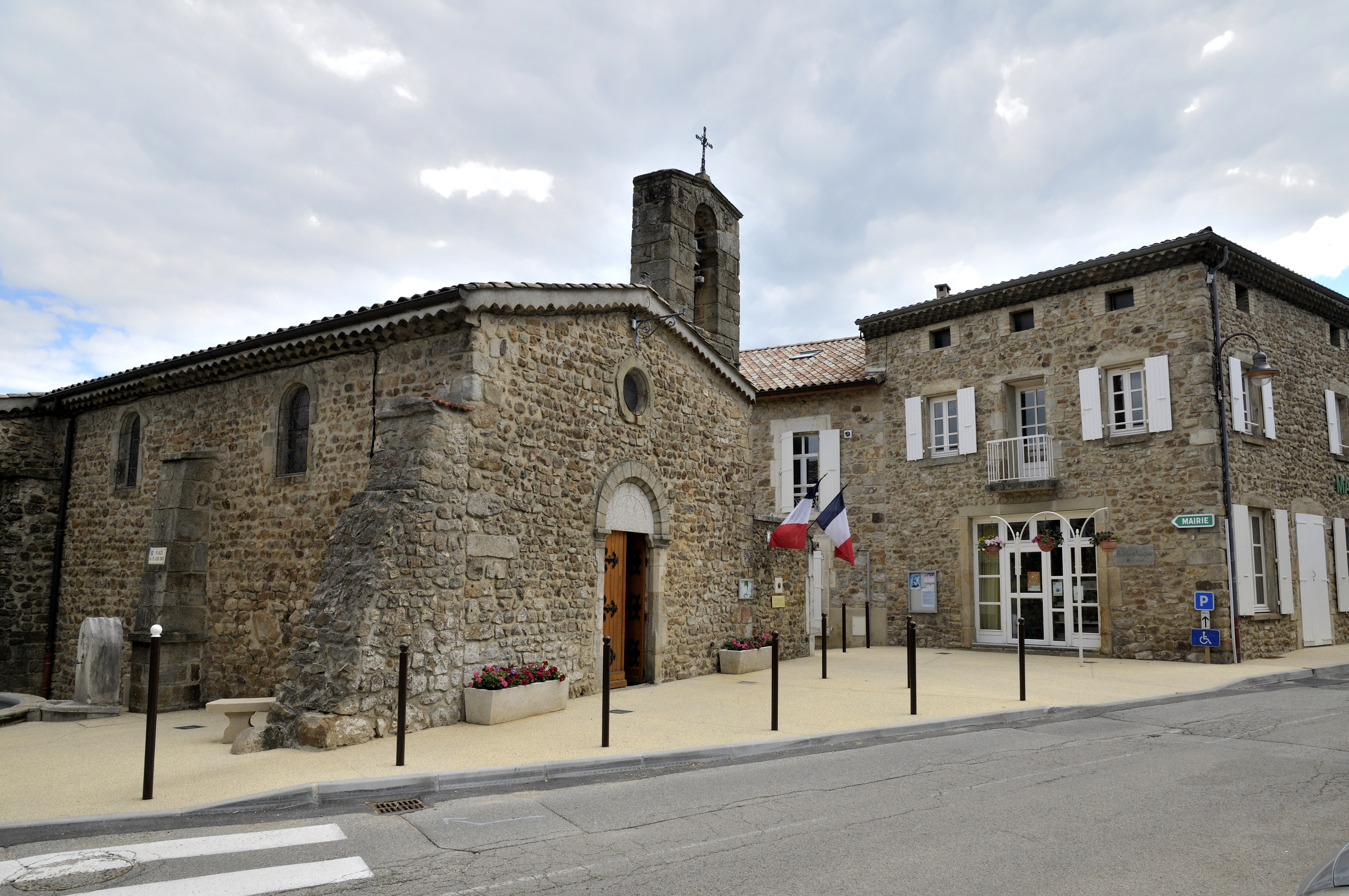
- The church and town hall

- Coat of arms
- Location of Saint-Georges-les-Bains
- Location within France Location within Auvergne-Rhône-Alpes
- Coordinates: 44°51′43″N 4°48′36″E
- Country: France
- Region: Auvergne-Rhône-Alpes
- Department: Ardèche
- Arrondissement: Tournon-sur-Rhône
- Canton: Rhône-Eyrieux

Government
  - Mayor (2020–2026): Geneviève Peyrard
- Area^{1}: 14.11 km^{2} (5.45 sq mi)
- Elevation: 290 m (950 ft)
- Highest elevation: 527 m (1,729 ft)
- Lowest elevation: 98 m (322 ft)
- Population (2023): 2,416
  - Density: 171.2/km^{2} (443.5/sq mi)
- Time zone: UTC+01:00 (CET)
  - Summer (DST): UTC+02:00 (CEST)
- INSEE/Postal code: 07240 /07800
- ^{1} French Land Register data, which excludes lakes, ponds, glaciers > 1 km^{2} (0.386 sq mi or 247 acres) and river estuaries.

Saint-Georges-les-Bains (French pronunciation: [sɛ̃ ʒɔʁʒ le bɛ̃]; Occitan: Sant Jòrdi) is a commune in the Ardèche department in southern France.

== Population ==
Historical population
Year	Pop.	±% p.a.
1968	1,015	—
1975	873	−2.13%
1982	1,257	+5.35%
1990	1,557	+2.71%
1999	1,716	+1.09%
2007	1,979	+1.80%
2012	2,090	+1.10%
2017	2,282	+1.77%
2023	2,416	+0.96%
Source: INSEE

== See also ==
- Communes of the Ardèche department
