= Saint-Apollinaire-de-Rias =

- Commune
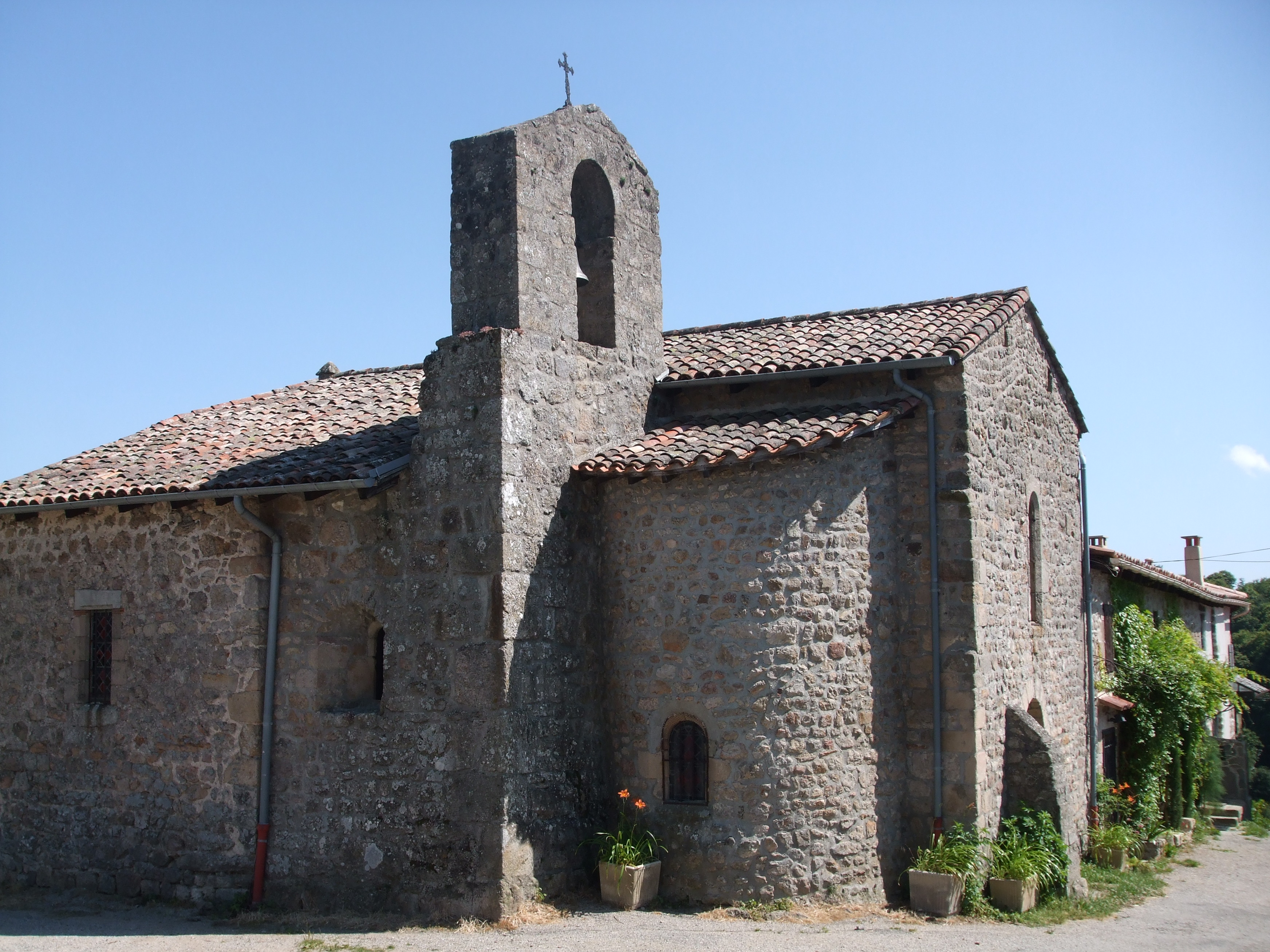
- The church in Saint-Apollinaire-de-Rias
- Location of Saint-Apollinaire-de-Rias
- Location within France Location within Auvergne-Rhône-Alpes
- Coordinates: 44°55′15″N 4°35′37″E
- Country: France
- Region: Auvergne-Rhône-Alpes
- Department: Ardèche
- Arrondissement: Privas
- Canton: Rhône-Eyrieux
- Intercommunality: CA Privas Centre Ardèche

Government
  - Mayor (2020–2026): Michel Cimaz
- Area^{1}: 8.34 km^{2} (3.22 sq mi)
- Elevation: 696 m (2,283 ft)
- Highest elevation: 834 m (2,736 ft)
- Lowest elevation: 492 m (1,614 ft)
- Population (2023): 195
  - Density: 23.4/km^{2} (60.6/sq mi)
- Time zone: UTC+01:00 (CET)
  - Summer (DST): UTC+02:00 (CEST)
- INSEE/Postal code: 07214 /07240
- ^{1} French Land Register data, which excludes lakes, ponds, glaciers > 1 km^{2} (0.386 sq mi or 247 acres) and river estuaries.

Saint-Apollinaire-de-Rias (French pronunciation: [sɛ̃t‿apɔlinɛʁ də ʁjas]; Vivaro-Alpine: Sant Apolinari de Riàs) is a commune in the Ardèche department in southern France.

== Population ==
Historical population
Year	Pop.	±% p.a.
1968	178	—
1975	140	−3.37%
1982	132	−0.84%
1990	128	−0.38%
1999	119	−0.81%
2007	155	+3.36%
2012	183	+3.38%
2017	201	+1.89%
2023	195	−0.50%
Source: INSEE

== See also ==
- Communes of the Ardèche department
