= Saint-Julien-le-Roux =

- Commune
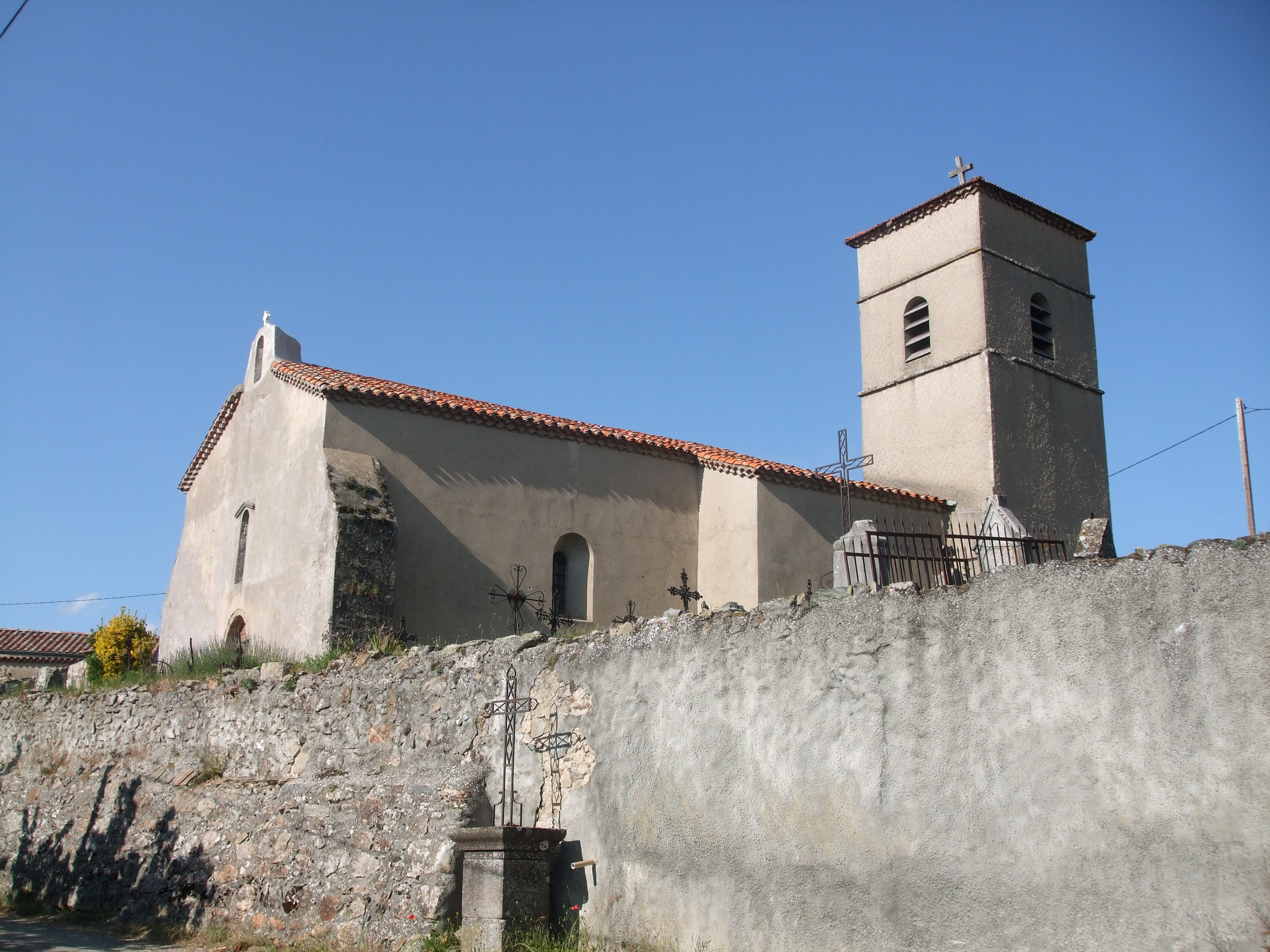
- The church in Saint-Julien-le-Roux
- Location of Saint-Julien-le-Roux
- Location within France Location within Auvergne-Rhône-Alpes
- Coordinates: 44°52′23″N 4°40′43″E
- Country: France
- Region: Auvergne-Rhône-Alpes
- Department: Ardèche
- Arrondissement: Privas
- Canton: Rhône-Eyrieux
- Intercommunality: CA Privas Centre Ardèche

Government
  - Mayor (2020–2026): Roselyne Peyrouze Vetter
- Area^{1}: 8.64 km^{2} (3.34 sq mi)
- Elevation: 680 m (2,230 ft)
- Highest elevation: 791 m (2,595 ft)
- Lowest elevation: 316 m (1,037 ft)
- Population (2023): 127
  - Density: 14.7/km^{2} (38.1/sq mi)
- Time zone: UTC+01:00 (CET)
  - Summer (DST): UTC+02:00 (CEST)
- INSEE/Postal code: 07257 /07240
- ^{1} French Land Register data, which excludes lakes, ponds, glaciers > 1 km^{2} (0.386 sq mi or 247 acres) and river estuaries.

Saint-Julien-le-Roux (French pronunciation: [sɛ̃ ʒyljɛ̃ lə ʁu]; Vivaro-Alpine: Sant Julian lo Rot) is a commune in the Ardèche department in southern France.

== Population ==
Historical population
Year	Pop.	±% p.a.
1968	149	—
1975	132	−1.72%
1982	111	−2.44%
1990	109	−0.23%
1999	91	−1.99%
2007	89	−0.28%
2012	95	+1.31%
2017	109	+2.79%
2023	127	+2.58%
Source: INSEE

== See also ==
- Communes of the Ardèche department
