= Charmes-sur-Rhône =

- Commune
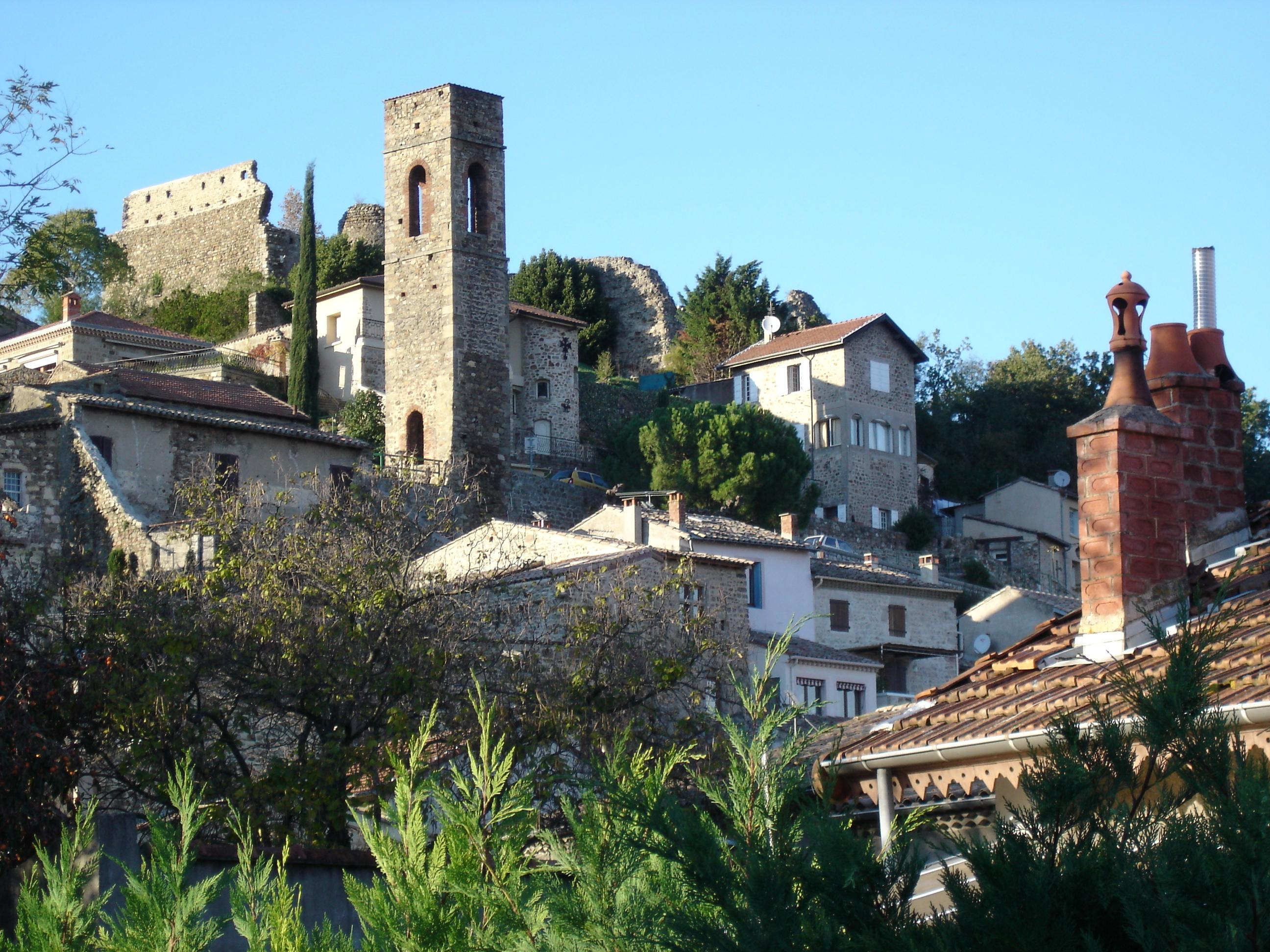
- A general view of Charmes-sur-Rhône

- Coat of arms
- Location of Charmes-sur-Rhône
- Location within France Location within Auvergne-Rhône-Alpes
- Coordinates: 44°51′52″N 4°50′10″E
- Country: France
- Region: Auvergne-Rhône-Alpes
- Department: Ardèche
- Arrondissement: Tournon-sur-Rhône
- Canton: Rhône-Eyrieux

Government
  - Mayor (2020–2026): Thierry Avouac
- Area^{1}: 5.95 km^{2} (2.30 sq mi)
- Elevation: 111 m (364 ft)
- Highest elevation: 223 m (732 ft)
- Lowest elevation: 106 m (348 ft)
- Population (2023): 3,143
  - Density: 528/km^{2} (1,370/sq mi)
- Time zone: UTC+01:00 (CET)
  - Summer (DST): UTC+02:00 (CEST)
- INSEE/Postal code: 07055 /07800
- ^{1} French Land Register data, which excludes lakes, ponds, glaciers > 1 km^{2} (0.386 sq mi or 247 acres) and river estuaries.

Charmes-sur-Rhône (French pronunciation: [ʃaʁm syʁ ʁon], literally Charmes on Rhône; Occitan: Charmas de Ròse) is a commune in the Ardèche department in southern France.

== Population ==
Historical population
Year	Pop.	±% p.a.
1968	937	—
1975	1,142	+2.87%
1982	1,550	+4.46%
1990	1,826	+2.07%
1999	2,070	+1.40%
2007	2,358	+1.64%
2012	2,534	+1.45%
2017	2,930	+2.95%
2023	3,143	+1.18%
Source: INSEE

== See also ==
- Communes of the Ardèche department
