= Soyons =

- Commune
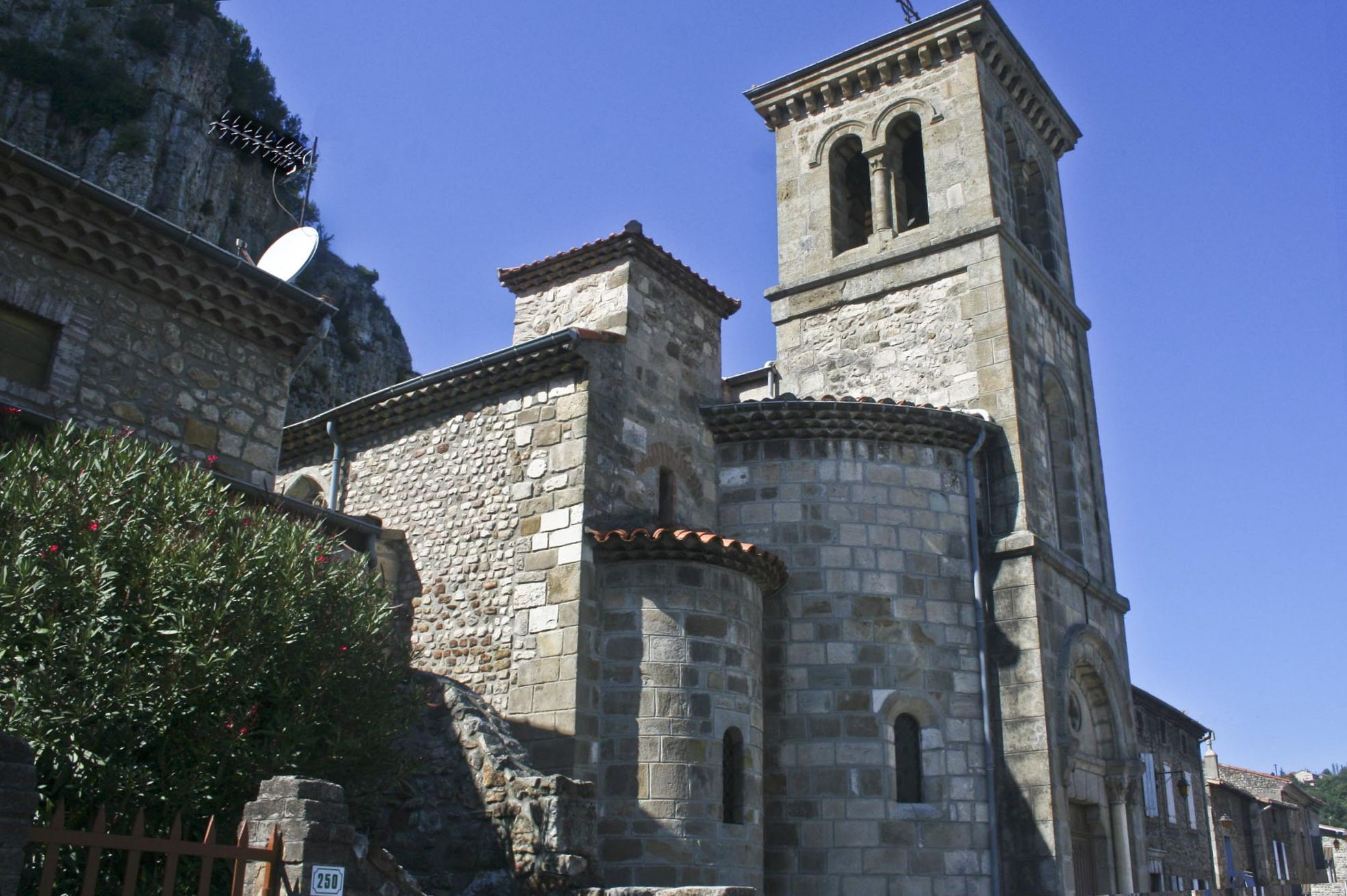
- The church in Soyons
- Location of Soyons
- Location within France Location within Auvergne-Rhône-Alpes
- Coordinates: 44°53′24″N 4°51′03″E
- Country: France
- Region: Auvergne-Rhône-Alpes
- Department: Ardèche
- Arrondissement: Tournon-sur-Rhône
- Canton: Rhône-Eyrieux

Government
  - Mayor (2020–2026): Hervé Coulmont
- Area^{1}: 7.9 km^{2} (3.1 sq mi)
- Elevation: 107 m (351 ft)
- Highest elevation: 280 m (920 ft)
- Lowest elevation: 104 m (341 ft)
- Population (2023): 2,341
  - Density: 300/km^{2} (770/sq mi)
- Time zone: UTC+01:00 (CET)
  - Summer (DST): UTC+02:00 (CEST)
- INSEE/Postal code: 07316 /07130
- ^{1} French Land Register data, which excludes lakes, ponds, glaciers > 1 km^{2} (0.386 sq mi or 247 acres) and river estuaries.

Soyons (French pronunciation: [swajɔ̃]; Occitan: Soions) is a commune in the Ardèche department in southern France.

== Population ==
Historical population
Year	Pop.	±% p.a.
1968	787	—
1975	942	+2.60%
1982	1,302	+4.73%
1990	1,551	+2.21%
1999	1,721	+1.16%
2007	1,976	+1.74%
2012	2,014	+0.38%
2017	2,238	+2.13%
2023	2,341	+0.75%
Source: INSEE

== See also ==
- Communes of the Ardèche department
