= Saint-Sauveur-de-Montagut =

- Commune
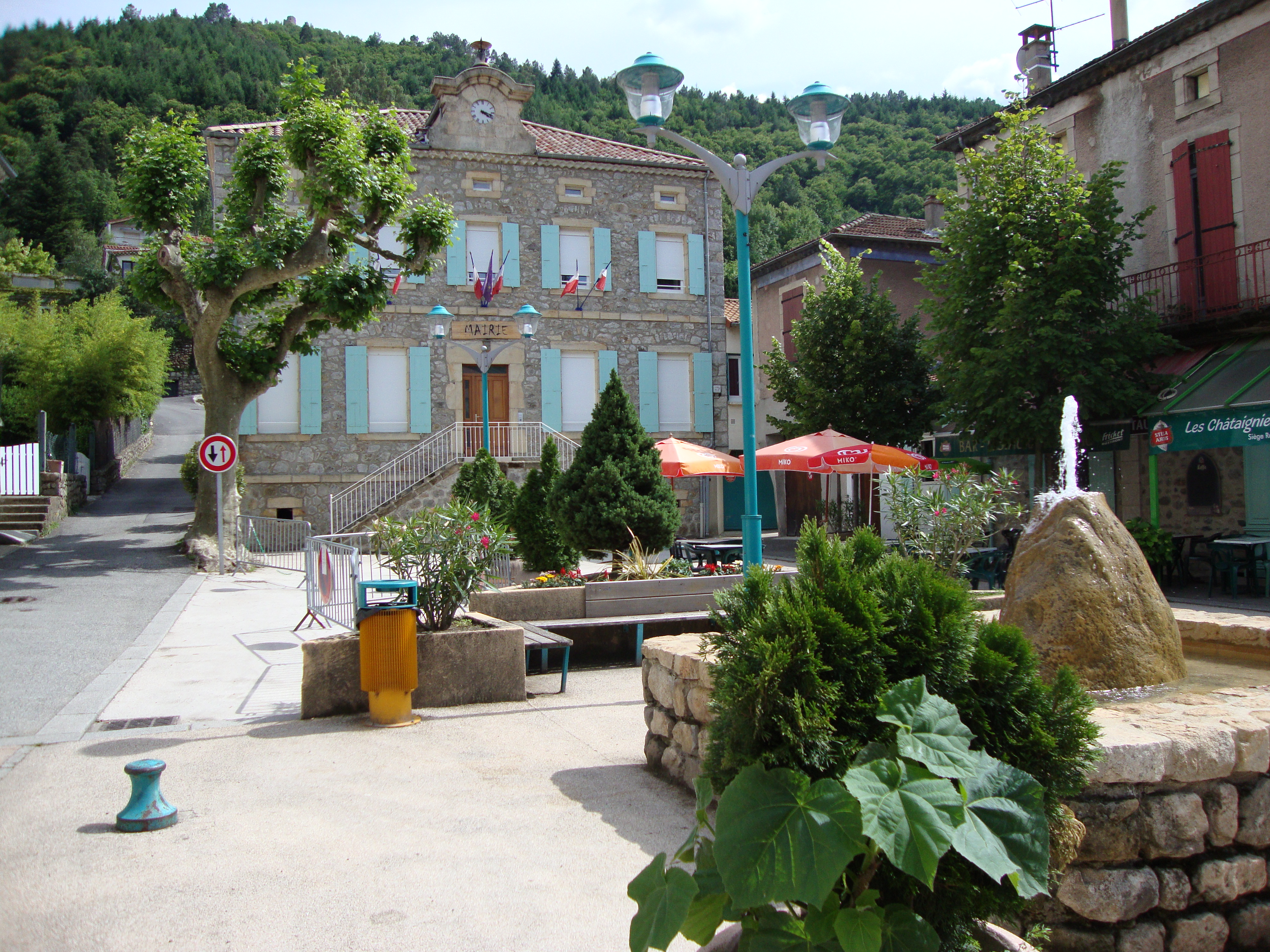
- Town hall

- Coat of arms
- Location of Saint-Sauveur-de-Montagut
- Location within France Location within Auvergne-Rhône-Alpes
- Coordinates: 44°49′20″N 4°34′50″E
- Country: France
- Region: Auvergne-Rhône-Alpes
- Department: Ardèche
- Arrondissement: Privas
- Canton: Haut-Eyrieux
- Intercommunality: CA Privas Centre Ardèche

Government
  - Mayor (2020–2026): Jacky Barbisan
- Area^{1}: 11.54 km^{2} (4.46 sq mi)
- Elevation: 216 m (709 ft)
- Highest elevation: 757 m (2,484 ft)
- Lowest elevation: 190 m (620 ft)
- Population (2023): 1,115
  - Density: 96.62/km^{2} (250.2/sq mi)
- Time zone: UTC+01:00 (CET)
  - Summer (DST): UTC+02:00 (CEST)
- INSEE/Postal code: 07295 /07190
- ^{1} French Land Register data, which excludes lakes, ponds, glaciers > 1 km^{2} (0.386 sq mi or 247 acres) and river estuaries.

Saint-Sauveur-de-Montagut (French pronunciation: [sɛ̃ sovœʁ də mɔ̃taɡy]; Vivaro-Alpine: Sant Sauvador de Montagut) is a commune of the Ardèche department in southern France.

The rivers Eyrieux, Glueyre and Auzène flow through the town.

== Sights ==
Ruins of an early-medieval castle (which was used as a watch tower/outpost) on one of the hills are the main historical remnant of what is one of France's most sparsely populated areas.

== Population ==
Historical population
Year	Pop.	±% p.a.
1968	1,650	—
1975	1,615	−0.31%
1982	1,439	−1.63%
1990	1,396	−0.38%
1999	1,248	−1.24%
2007	1,154	−0.97%
2012	1,114	−0.70%
2017	1,111	−0.05%
2023	1,115	+0.06%
Source: INSEE

== Culture ==
Protestantism is strong in the town, with the town having both a Protestant temple and a Roman Catholic church.

== Economy ==
Saint-Sauveur-de-Montagut had quite a large textile industry, but in modern times there are hardly any factories left. However, a medium-sized plant nursery now exists, along with a nursing home, a mineral water producer, a comprehensive school and an ice-cream factory.

== Tourism ==
In the summer months many tourists, mainly from the Netherlands, flock to the town where attractions such as la Plage (an artificial beach), a canoe-kayak centre and various paths for hiking/walking make the town a very good tourist spot. There are also two camp sites in the town, one in the outskirts and one in the small suburb of le Moulinon. There are also tourist cottages and other settlements such as the hamlet Maléon which also make up the town.

== See also ==
- Communes of the Ardèche department
