= Saint-Laurent-du-Pape =

- Commune
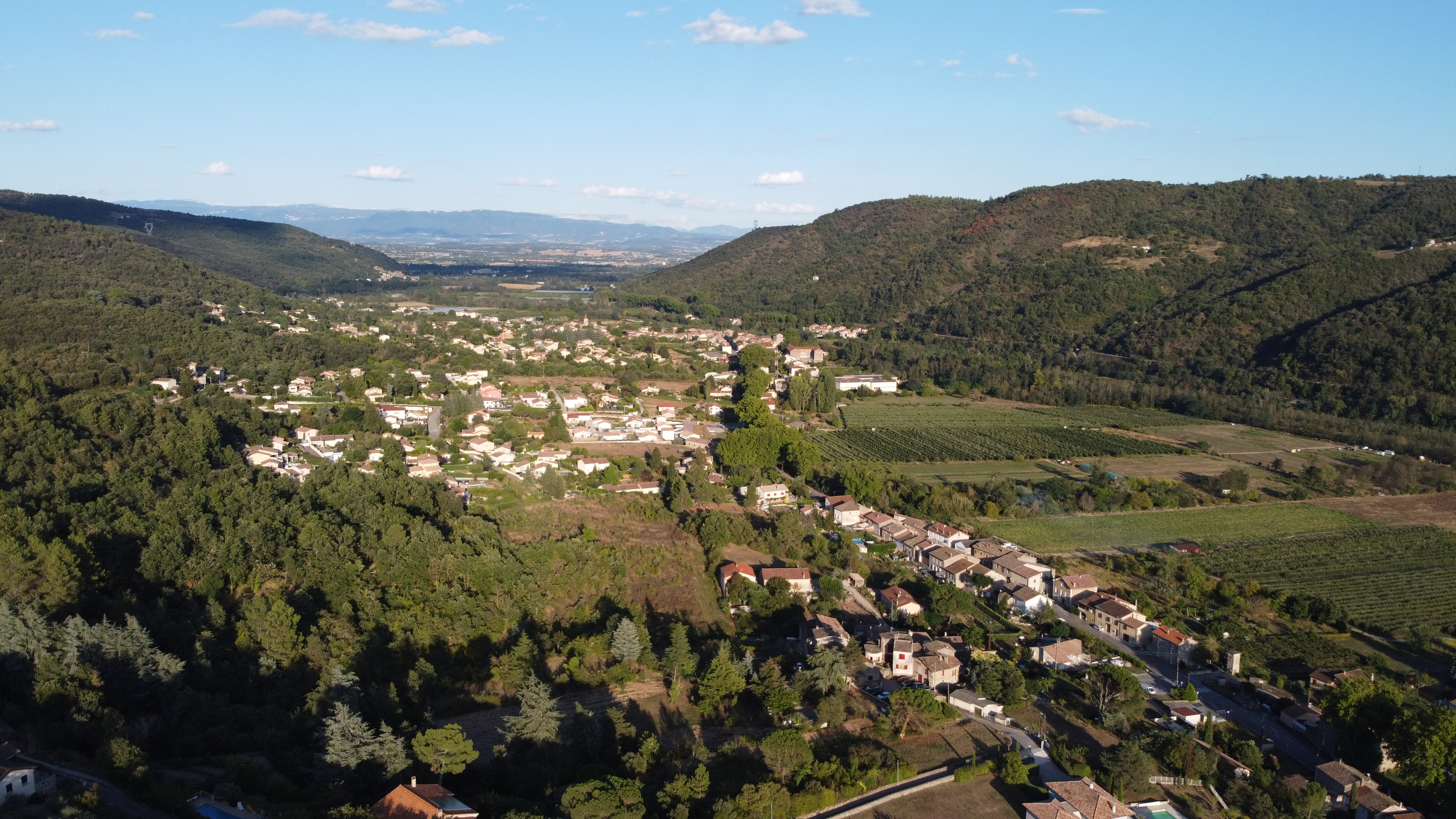
- Aerial view of Saint Laurent Du Pape from the west side of the village
- Location of Saint-Laurent-du-Pape
- Location within France Location within Auvergne-Rhône-Alpes
- Coordinates: 44°49′27″N 4°46′03″E
- Country: France
- Region: Auvergne-Rhône-Alpes
- Department: Ardèche
- Arrondissement: Privas
- Canton: Rhône-Eyrieux
- Intercommunality: CA Privas Centre Ardèche

Government
  - Mayor (2020–2026): Frédéric Garayt
- Area^{1}: 20.1 km^{2} (7.8 sq mi)
- Elevation: 120 m (390 ft)
- Highest elevation: 535 m (1,755 ft)
- Lowest elevation: 106 m (348 ft)
- Population (2023): 1,618
  - Density: 80.5/km^{2} (208/sq mi)
- Time zone: UTC+01:00 (CET)
  - Summer (DST): UTC+02:00 (CEST)
- INSEE/Postal code: 07261 /07800
- ^{1} French Land Register data, which excludes lakes, ponds, glaciers > 1 km^{2} (0.386 sq mi or 247 acres) and river estuaries.

Saint-Laurent-du-Pape (French pronunciation: [sɛ̃ loʁɑ̃ dy pap]; Occitan: Sant Laurent) is a commune in the Ardèche department in southern France.

== Population ==
Historical population
Year	Pop.	±% p.a.
1968	1,194	—
1975	1,159	−0.42%
1982	1,174	+0.18%
1990	1,206	+0.34%
1999	1,295	+0.79%
2007	1,507	+1.91%
2012	1,587	+1.04%
2017	1,566	−0.27%
2023	1,618	+0.55%
Source: INSEE

== Notable people ==
- Joran Gerbet (born 2001) – footballer

== See also ==
- Communes of the Ardèche department
