= Eyrieux =

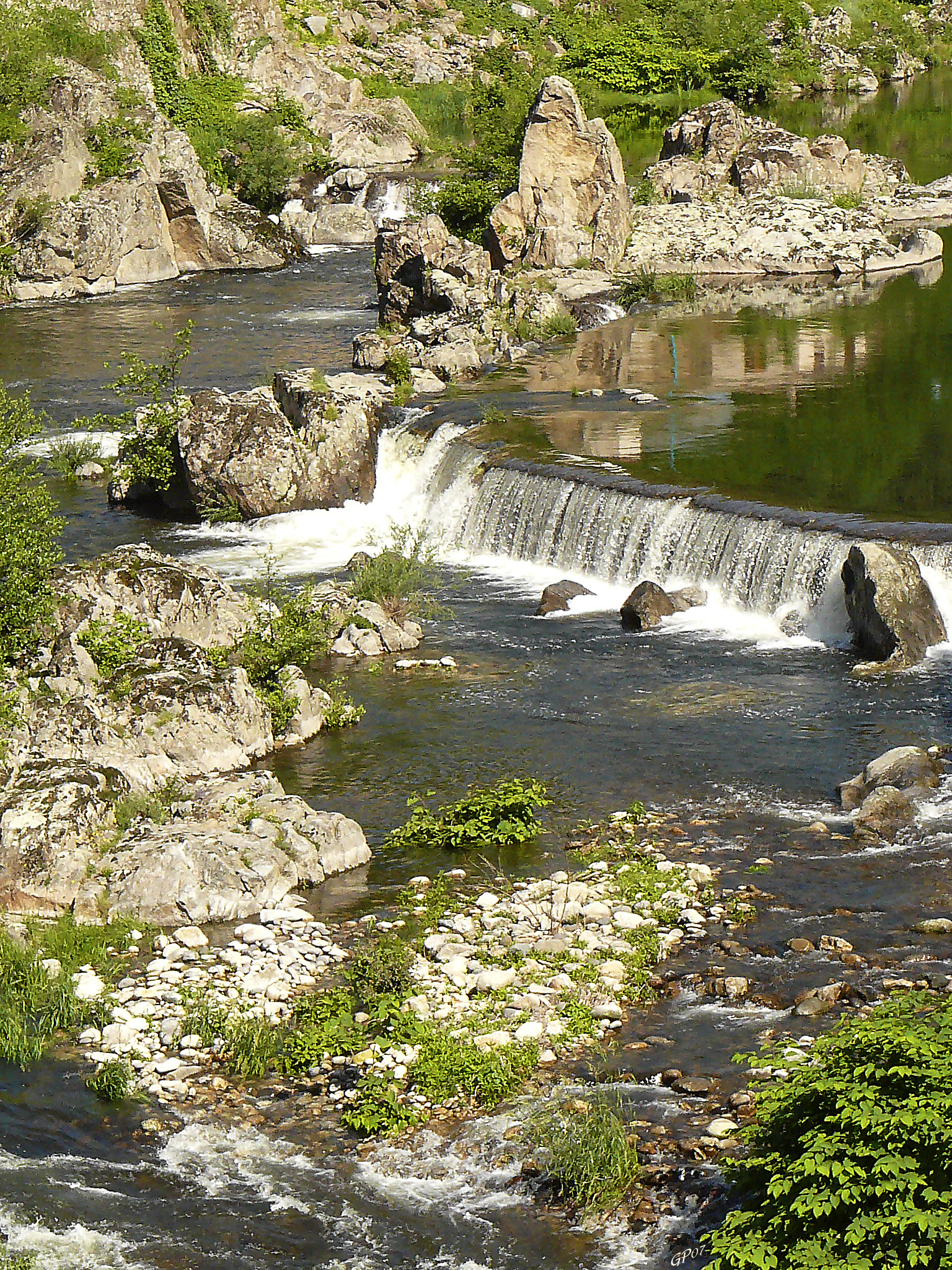

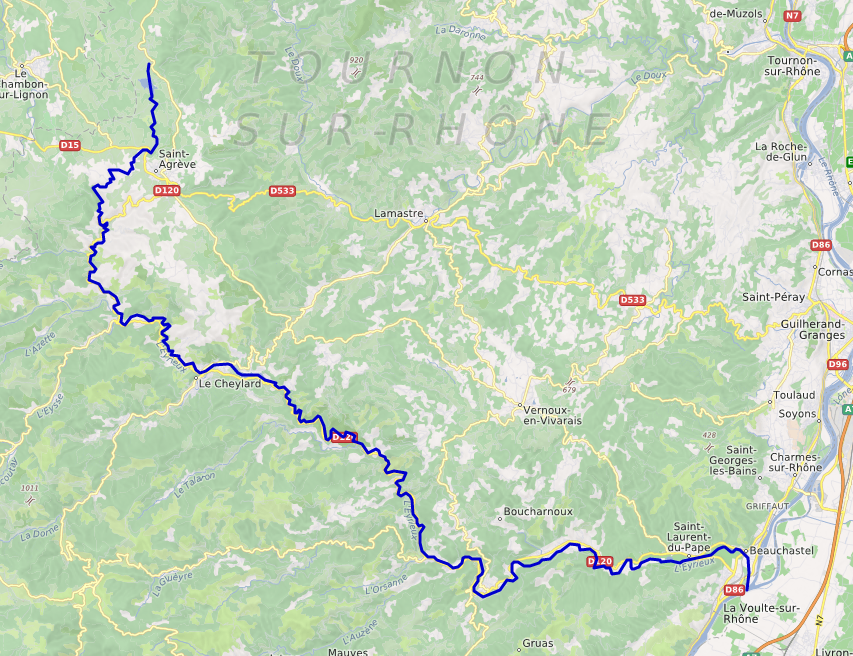
- Native name: L'Eyrieux (French)

Location
- Country: France

Physical characteristics
- Source
  - location: Massif Central
  - elevation: 1,105 m (3,625 ft)
- Mouth
  - location: Rhône
  - coordinates: 44°48′25″N 4°48′3″E
- Length: 83 km (52 mi)

Basin features
- Progression: Rhône→ Mediterranean Sea

The Eyrieux (French pronunciation: [eʁjø]) is a tributary of the Rhône in the Ardèche department, France. The Eyrieux runs for 83 kilometres (52 mi). It begins in the Massif Central and joins the Rhône just downstream of Valence.

The Eyrieux has at least three distinct landscapes. Above Le Cheylard, the plateau is marked by the sugarloaf cones of old volcanoes, and the land is used mostly for raising cattle and sheep. In its middle section, down to Saint-Sauveur-de-Montagut and Les Ollières-sur-Eyrieux, the river is torrential and prone to flash floods and extreme variation. Formerly used for silk mills, it is now used for micro-hydroelectric production, and is a popular spot for canoeing. The river never dries up in summer, as the many dams and barrages maintain a steady flow. The lower section to the Rhône, at Beauchastel and La Voulte-sur-Rhône, opens into the valley and allows intensive farming, especially peach orchards which are best viewed when the trees bloom in the spring.
