= Vernoux-en-Vivarais =

Vernoux-en-Vivarais Vernos/Vernons (Occitan)
- Commune
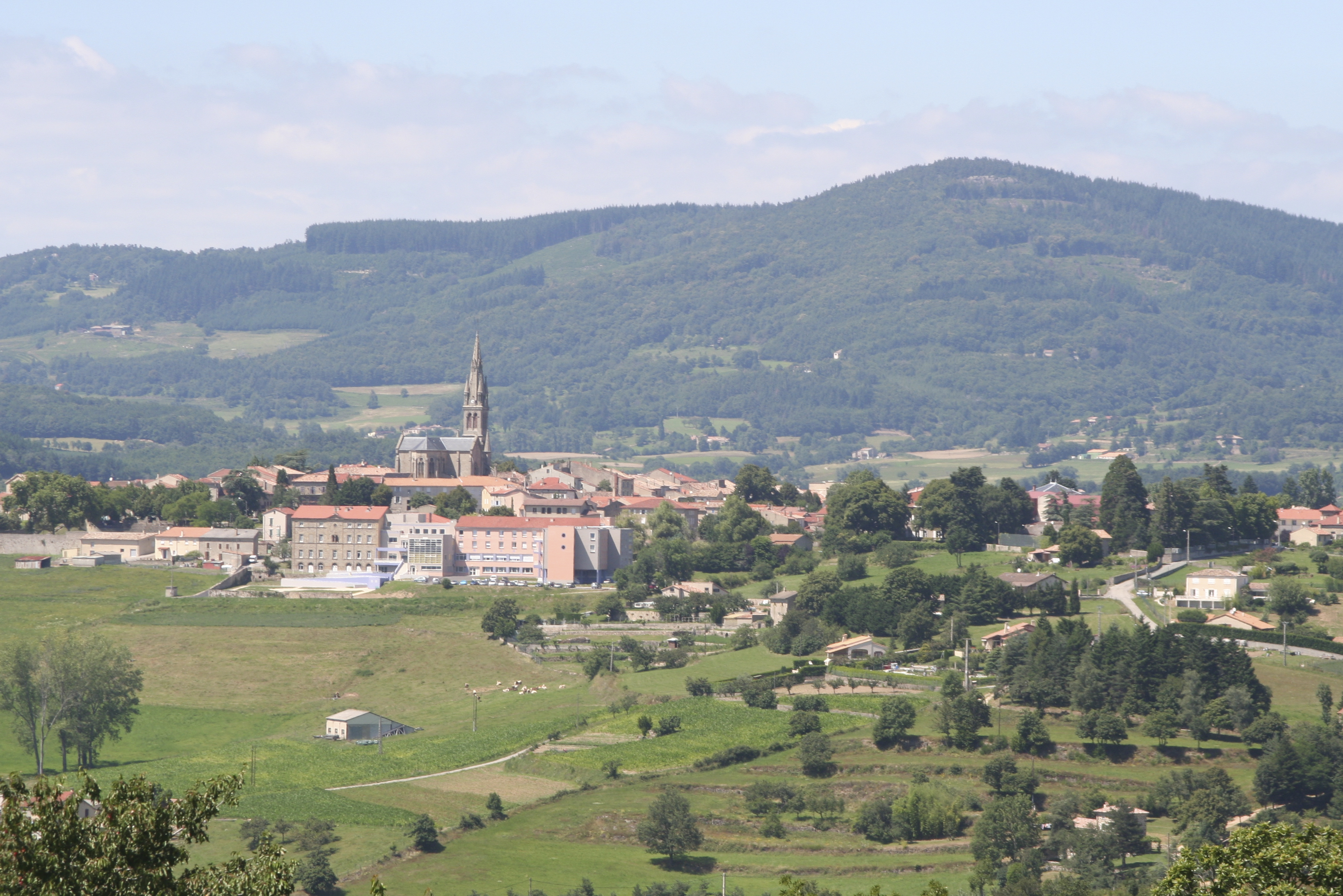
- A general view of Vernoux-en-Vivarais

- Coat of arms
- Location of Vernoux-en-Vivarais
- Location within France Location within Auvergne-Rhône-Alpes
- Coordinates: 44°53′47″N 4°38′46″E
- Country: France
- Region: Auvergne-Rhône-Alpes
- Department: Ardèche
- Arrondissement: Privas
- Canton: Rhône-Eyrieux
- Intercommunality: CA Privas Centre Ardèche

Government
  - Mayor (2020–2026): Martine Finiels
- Area^{1}: 30.55 km^{2} (11.80 sq mi)
- Elevation: 585 m (1,919 ft)
- Highest elevation: 949 m (3,114 ft)
- Lowest elevation: 360 m (1,180 ft)
- Population (2023): 1,982
  - Density: 64.88/km^{2} (168.0/sq mi)
- Time zone: UTC+01:00 (CET)
  - Summer (DST): UTC+02:00 (CEST)
- INSEE/Postal code: 07338 /07240
- Website: www.vernoux-en-vivarais.fr
- ^{1} French Land Register data, which excludes lakes, ponds, glaciers > 1 km^{2} (0.386 sq mi or 247 acres) and river estuaries.

Vernoux-en-Vivarais (French pronunciation: [vɛʁnu ɑ̃ vivaʁɛ]; lit. 'Vernoux-in-Vivarais'; Occitan: Vernos or Vernons) is a commune in the Ardèche department in southern France.

== Population ==
Historical population
Year	Pop.	±% p.a.
1968	1,941	—
1975	1,885	−0.42%
1982	1,969	+0.62%
1990	2,037	+0.43%
1999	1,721	−1.86%
2007	1,900	+1.24%
2012	1,894	−0.06%
2017	1,958	+0.67%
2023	1,982	+0.20%
Source: INSEE

== Climate ==
Climate data for Vernoux-en-Vivarais, elevation 561 m (1,841 ft), (1991–2020 normals, extremes 1892–present)
Month	Jan	Feb	Mar	Apr	May	Jun	Jul	Aug	Sep	Oct	Nov	Dec	Year
Record high °C (°F)	20.4 (68.7)	20.0 (68.0)	23.5 (74.3)	27.4 (81.3)	31.5 (88.7)	37.0 (98.6)	36.2 (97.2)	37.5 (99.5)	31.3 (88.3)	29.1 (84.4)	21.8 (71.2)	21.1 (70.0)	37.5 (99.5)
Mean daily maximum °C (°F)	6.6 (43.9)	7.7 (45.9)	11.7 (53.1)	14.8 (58.6)	18.8 (65.8)	23.1 (73.6)	25.9 (78.6)	25.6 (78.1)	20.6 (69.1)	15.7 (60.3)	10.2 (50.4)	7.2 (45.0)	15.7 (60.3)
Daily mean °C (°F)	3.5 (38.3)	4.0 (39.2)	7.3 (45.1)	10.0 (50.0)	13.8 (56.8)	17.7 (63.9)	20.1 (68.2)	19.8 (67.6)	15.6 (60.1)	11.8 (53.2)	7.0 (44.6)	4.2 (39.6)	11.2 (52.2)
Mean daily minimum °C (°F)	0.4 (32.7)	0.4 (32.7)	2.9 (37.2)	5.2 (41.4)	8.9 (48.0)	12.3 (54.1)	14.4 (57.9)	14.1 (57.4)	10.6 (51.1)	7.9 (46.2)	3.8 (38.8)	1.2 (34.2)	6.8 (44.2)
Record low °C (°F)	−17.2 (1.0)	−20.0 (−4.0)	−13.0 (8.6)	−5.0 (23.0)	−3.0 (26.6)	1.0 (33.8)	4.0 (39.2)	4.0 (39.2)	−1.2 (29.8)	−6.0 (21.2)	−9.0 (15.8)	−17.0 (1.4)	−20.0 (−4.0)
Average precipitation mm (inches)	81.8 (3.22)	54.9 (2.16)	62.7 (2.47)	90.7 (3.57)	104.2 (4.10)	72.9 (2.87)	75.1 (2.96)	84.6 (3.33)	137.9 (5.43)	186.0 (7.32)	170.2 (6.70)	82.6 (3.25)	1,203.6 (47.39)
Average precipitation days (≥ 1.0 mm)	8.5	7.3	7.1	9.0	9.4	7.4	7.1	6.9	6.9	9.7	10.6	9.0	98.9
Source: Meteociel

== See also ==
- Communes of the Ardèche department
