= San Vincenzo =

San Vincenzo may refer to:

- Vincenzo, Martyr of Craco, Patron Saint of Craco, Italy
- Italian for Saint Vincent

San Vincenzo may also refer to the following places in Italy:

- San Vincenzo, Tuscany, in the province of Livorno
- San Vincenzo La Costa, in the province of Cosenza
- San Vincenzo Valle Roveto, in the province of L'Aquila
- San Vincenzo Ferreri, Racconigi, a church and convent in Racconigi, Cuneo, Piedmont, Italy
- San Vincenzo, Modena, Catholic church, Corso Canalgrande, Modena, Italy

== See also ==
- Saint Vincent (disambiguation)
- Vincenzo
