= Saint Vincenza =

Saint Vincenza may refer to:

- Vincenza Gerosa (1784–1847), Italian Catholic saint
- Vincenza Maria Poloni (1802–1855), Italian Catholic saint
- Vicenta María López i Vicuña (1847–1890), Spanish Catholic saint, also known as Vincenza María López i Vicuña

== See also ==
- Saint Vincent
