= St. Vincent's Hospital =

St Vincent's Hospital, St. Vincent Hospital or St. Vincent's Medical Center may refer to:

== Australia ==
- St Vincent's Hospital (Brisbane), Queensland, Australia
- St Vincent's Hospital, Melbourne, in Fitzroy, Melbourne, Australia
- St Vincent's Hospital, Sydney, in Darlinghurst, New South Wales, a suburb of Sydney
- St Vincent's Private Hospital Melbourne, Victoria

== Ireland ==
- St. Vincent's Hospital, Athy, County Kildare
- St. Vincent's Hospital, Fairview, Dublin
- St. Vincent's Private Hospital (Dublin)
- St. Vincent's University Hospital, Dublin

== United Kingdom ==
- St Vincent's Hospital, Kingussie, Scotland

== United States ==
(by state, then city)

- St. Vincent's Health System, a hospital and specialty clinic operator based in Birmingham, Alabama
- St. Vincent Medical Center (Los Angeles), California
- St. Vincent Health (Leadville, Colorado)
- St. Vincent's Medical Center (Bridgeport), Connecticut
- St. Vincent's HealthCare, a hospital network in Jacksonville, Florida
  - St. Vincent's Medical Center Riverside, Jacksonville, Florida
  - St. Vincent's Medical Center Southside, Jacksonville, Florida
- St. Vincent Health, health system based in Indiana
  - St. Vincent Indianapolis Hospital, Indianapolis, Indiana
  - St. Vincent Williamsport Hospital, Williamsport, Indiana
  - St. Vincent Evansville, Evansville, Indiana
- Saint Vincent Hospital, Erie, Pennsylvania
- Saint Vincent Hospital, Worcester, Massachusetts
- St. Vincent's Hospital (Normandy, Missouri)
- CHRISTUS St. Vincent Regional Medical Center, formerly St. Vincent Hospital, Santa Fe, New Mexico
- Saint Vincent's Catholic Medical Center, New York City (defunct)
- St. Vincent's Hospital (Staten Island), New York, former name of Richmond University Medical Center
- St. Vincent Charity Medical Center, Cleveland, Ohio
- St. Vincent Mercy Children's Hospital, Toledo, Ohio
- Mercy Health - St. Vincent Medical Center, Toledo, Ohio
- Providence St. Vincent Medical Center, Portland, Oregon
- St. Vincent Hospital, Green Bay, Wisconsin

== See also ==
- Saint Vincent (disambiguation)
- St. Vincent's (disambiguation)
