= Assumption of the Virgin (Champaigne) =

Painting by Philippe de Champaigne

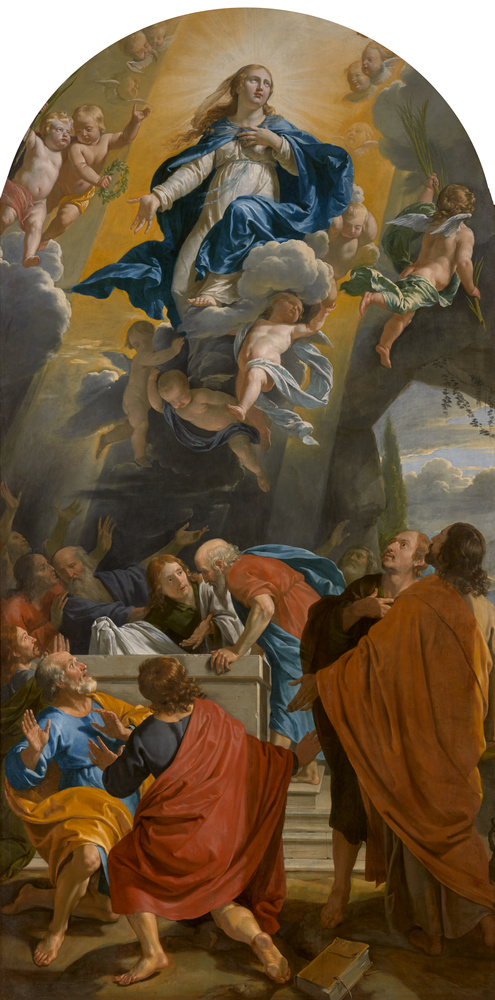
Assumption of the Virgin (1638) by Philippe de Champaigne

Assumption of the Virgin is an oil on canvas painting by Philippe de Champaigne, from 1638. It depicts the assumption of Mary, now in the Museum of Grenoble.

It was commissioned by Léon Bouthillier, son of Claude Bouthillier, surintendant des finances under Louis XIII, to put in the church of the Carmel de l'Annonciation on rue Saint-Jacques in Paris. It was placed between two other paintings by the same artist, one of Germanus of Auxerre and the other of Saint Vincent.

== See also ==
- The Raising of Lazarus by the same artist, also in the Museum of Grenoble
