= St. Vincent's =

St. Vincent's may refer to:

== Schools ==
- Ascham St Vincent's School, preparatory school in England
- St. Vincent's Academy, in Savannah, Georgia
- St. Vincent's C.B.S., a secondary school in Dublin, Ireland
- St Vincent's College, Potts Point, a girls' school Sydney, Australia,
- St. Vincent's High and Technical School, eastern India
- St. Vincent's High School, Pune, India
- St. Vincent's College, Los Angeles, California, later Loyola Marymount University

== Other uses ==
- St. Vincent's Day Care, a non-profit agency
- St Vincents GAA, a Gaelic Athletic Association club based in Ireland
- St. Vincent's Health System, a hospital and specialty clinic operator based in Birmingham, Alabama
- St. Vincent's HealthCare, a network of hospitals in Jacksonville, Florida, U.S.
- Saint Vincent's Infant Asylum, a former orphanage in Milwaukee, Wisconsin
- St Vincent's Quarter, Sheffield, South Yorkshire, Yorkshire and the Humber, England, United Kingdom
- St. Vincent's-St. Stephen's-Peter's River, Canada
- Society of Saint Vincent de Paul, an international voluntary organization

== See also ==
- Saint Vincent (disambiguation)
- St. Vincent's Hospital (disambiguation)
- Vincent's Club, a private members' club in Oxford, England
