= Saint Vincent =

Saint Vincent may refer to:

== People ==
=== Saints ===
- Saint Vincenca, 3rd century Roman martyress, whose relics are in Blato, Croatia
- Vincenzo, Martyr of Craco (died 286), said to have been one of the Theban Legion
- Vincent of Saragossa (died 304), a.k.a. Vincent the Deacon, deacon and martyr
- Vincent, Orontius, and Victor (died 305), martyrs who evangelized in the Pyrenees
- Saint Vincent of Digne (died 379), French bishop of Digne
- Vincent of Lérins (died 445), Church father, Gallic author of early Christian writings
- Vincent Madelgarius (died 677), Benedictine monk who established two monasteries in France
- Vincent Ferrer (1350–1419), Valencian Dominican missionary and logician
- Vincent de Paul (1581–1660), Catholic priest who served the poor
- Vicente Liem de la Paz (Vincent Liem Nguyen, 1732–1773), Vincent Duong, Vincent Tuong, and Vincent Yen Do of the Vietnamese Martyrs
- Vincent Pallotti (1795–1850), Italian ecclesiastic

=== Other people ===
- John Jervis, 1st Earl of St Vincent (1735–1823), British commander at Battle of Cape St. Vincent (1797), later First Lord of the Admiralty
- St. Vincent (musician) (born 1982), stage name for Annie Clark, American multi-instrumentalist, singer, and songwriter
- Saint Vincent (musician) (born 1976), French musician who created the industrial black metal band Blacklodge

== Places ==
=== Saint Vincent ===
- Saint Vincent and the Grenadines, a sovereign state in the Caribbean Sea, often known simply as Saint Vincent
- Saint Vincent (Saint Vincent and the Grenadines), the main island of Saint Vincent and the Grenadines

=== Portugal ===
- Cape St. Vincent, a peninsula in Faro District

=== Canada ===
- Saint-Vincent-de-Paul, Quebec, a borough in Laval, Quebec
- St. Vincent Township, Ontario, a former township, now part of Meaford, Ontario
- St. Vincent, Alberta, a village located near the town of Saint Paul in the province of Alberta
- Saint-Vincent River, a river in Quebec

=== France ===
- Saint-Vincent, Haute-Garonne, in the Haute-Garonne département
- Saint-Vincent, Haute-Loire, in the Haute-Loire département
- Saint-Vincent, Puy-de-Dôme, in the Puy-de-Dôme département
- Saint-Vincent, Pyrénées-Atlantiques, in the Pyrénées-Atlantiques département
- Saint-Vincent, Tarn-et-Garonne, in the Tarn-et-Garonne département
- Saint-Vincent-Bragny, in the Saône-et-Loire département
- Saint-Vincent-Cramesnil, in the Seine-Maritime département
- Saint-Vincent-de-Barbeyrargues, in the Hérault département
- Saint-Vincent-de-Barrès, in the Ardèche département
- Saint-Vincent-de-Boisset, in the Loire département
- Saint-Vincent-de-Connezac, in the Dordogne département
- Saint-Vincent-de-Cosse, in the Dordogne département
- Saint-Vincent-de-Durfort, in the Ardèche département
- Saint-Vincent-de-Lamontjoie, in the Lot-et-Garonne département
- Saint-Vincent-de-Mercuze, in the Isère département
- Saint-Vincent-de-Paul, Gironde, in the Gironde département
- Saint-Vincent-de-Paul, Landes, in the Landes département
- Saint-Vincent-de-Pertignas, in the Gironde département
- Saint-Vincent-de-Reins, in the Rhône département
- Saint-Vincent-de-Salers, in the Cantal département
- Saint-Vincent-des-Bois, in the Eure département
- Saint-Vincent-des-Landes, in the Loire-Atlantique département
- Saint-Vincent-des-Prés, Saône-et-Loire, in the Saône-et-Loire département
- Saint-Vincent-des-Prés, Sarthe, in the Sarthe département
- Saint-Vincent-de-Tyrosse, in the Landes département
- Saint-Vincent-d'Olargues, in the Hérault département
- Saint-Vincent-du-Boulay, in the Eure département
- Saint-Vincent-du-Lorouër, in the Sarthe département
- Saint-Vincent-du-Pendit, in the Lot département
- Saint-Vincent-en-Bresse, in the Saône-et-Loire département
- Saint-Vincent-Jalmoutiers, in the Dordogne département
- Saint-Vincent-la-Châtre, in the Deux-Sèvres département
- Saint-Vincent-la-Commanderie, in the Drôme département
- Saint-Vincent-le-Paluel, in the Dordogne département
- Saint-Vincent-les-Forts, in the Alpes-de-Haute-Provence département
- Saint-Vincent-Lespinasse, in the Tarn-et-Garonne département
- Saint-Vincent-Rive-d'Olt, in the Lot département
- Saint-Vincent-Sterlanges, in the Vendée département
- Saint-Vincent-sur-Graon, in the Vendée département
- Saint-Vincent-sur-Jabron, in the Alpes-de-Haute-Provence département
- Saint-Vincent-sur-Jard, in the Vendée département
- Saint-Vincent-sur-l'Isle, in the Dordogne département
- Saint-Vincent-sur-Oust, in the Morbihan département
- Jonquières-Saint-Vincent, in the Gard département

=== Italy ===
- Saint-Vincent, Aosta Valley

=== United States ===
- Saint Vincent, California, an unincorporated community in Marin County
- St. Vincent, Minnesota
- St. Vincent Township, Kittson County, Minnesota
- St. Vincent Island, Florida

=== Australia ===
- St Vincent County, cadastral in Australian Capital Territory

== Colleges ==
- Saint Vincent College in Latrobe, Pennsylvania, US
- St Vincent College in Gosport, England

== Entertainment ==
- St. Vincent (film), a 2014 comedy film starring Bill Murray
- St. Vincent (album), the eponymous 2014 album by St. Vincent
- The Boys of St. Vincent, a 1993 docudrama film

== Health care ==
- St. Vincent Health, an Indiana-based health care provider
- St. Vincent (Indianapolis), a 1983 public artwork in St. Vincent Indianapolis Hospital
- St. Vincent-Ein Kerem, home for physically or mentally disabled children in Jerusalem

== Ships ==
- HMS St Vincent
- HMS St Vincent (1815)
- HMS St Vincent (1908)
- St Vincent-class battleship
- St Vincent (1829), sailed on the Australia Run carrying emigrants or convicts
- St Vincent (clipper ship), 1865 clipper ship renamed the Axel

== Other uses ==
- Battle of Cape St. Vincent (1797)
- Gulf St Vincent, major inlet of South Australia
- St. Vincent (horse), an American Thoroughbred racehorse

== See also ==
- St. Vincent's (disambiguation)
- San Vicente (disambiguation)
- San Vincenzo (disambiguation)
- São Vicente (disambiguation)
- St. Vincent's Church (disambiguation)
- Vincent (disambiguation)
