= Sainte-Nathalène =

- Commune
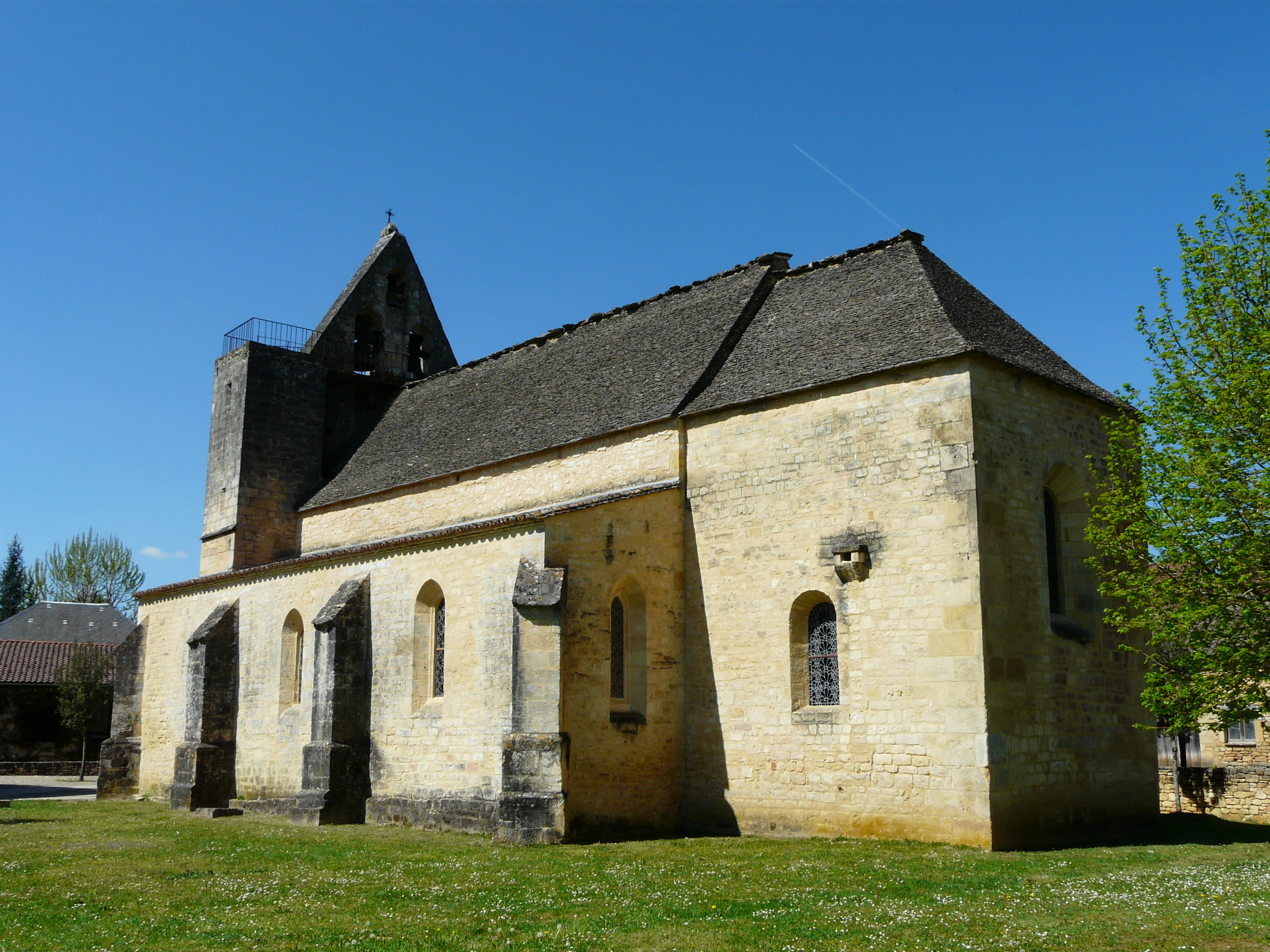
- The church in Sainte-Nathalène
- Location of Sainte-Nathalène
- Location within France Location within Nouvelle-Aquitaine
- Coordinates: 44°54′23″N 1°17′15″E
- Country: France
- Region: Nouvelle-Aquitaine
- Department: Dordogne
- Arrondissement: Sarlat-la-Canéda
- Canton: Sarlat-la-Canéda

Government
  - Mayor (2020–2026): Jean-Michel Perusin
- Area^{1}: 13.57 km^{2} (5.24 sq mi)
- Elevation: 115 m (377 ft)
- Highest elevation: 251 m (823 ft)
- Lowest elevation: 108 m (354 ft)
- Population (2023): 648
  - Density: 47.8/km^{2} (124/sq mi)
- Time zone: UTC+01:00 (CET)
  - Summer (DST): UTC+02:00 (CEST)
- INSEE/Postal code: 24471 /24200
- ^{1} French Land Register data, which excludes lakes, ponds, glaciers > 1 km^{2} (0.386 sq mi or 247 acres) and river estuaries.

Sainte-Nathalène (French pronunciation: [sɛ̃t natalɛn]; Occitan: Senta Nalena) is a commune in the Dordogne department in Nouvelle-Aquitaine in southwestern France.

== Population ==
Historical population
Year	Pop.	±% p.a.
1968	310	—
1975	297	−0.61%
1982	346	+2.21%
1990	364	+0.64%
1999	471	+2.90%
2007	529	+1.46%
2012	581	+1.89%
2017	595	+0.48%
2023	648	+1.43%
Source: INSEE

== See also ==
- Communes of the Dordogne department
