= Tamniès =

- Commune
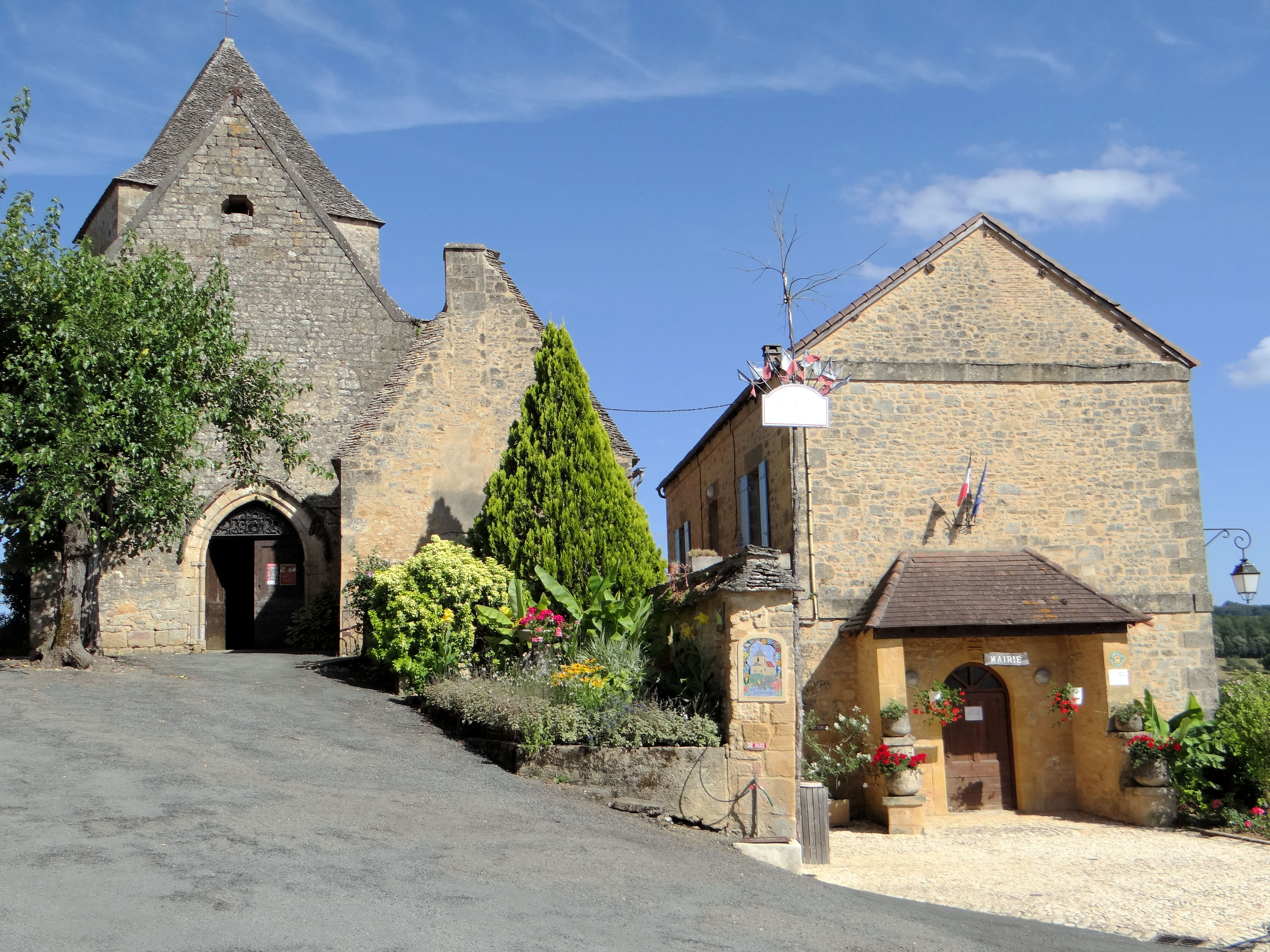
- The church, museum and town hall in Tamniès
- Location of Tamniès
- Location within France Location within Nouvelle-Aquitaine
- Coordinates: 44°58′01″N 1°09′01″E
- Country: France
- Region: Nouvelle-Aquitaine
- Department: Dordogne
- Arrondissement: Sarlat-la-Canéda
- Canton: Sarlat-la-Canéda

Government
  - Mayor (2020–2026): Olivier Lamonzie
- Area^{1}: 19.09 km^{2} (7.37 sq mi)
- Elevation: 200 m (660 ft)
- Highest elevation: 288 m (945 ft)
- Lowest elevation: 104 m (341 ft)
- Population (2023): 414
  - Density: 21.7/km^{2} (56.2/sq mi)
- Time zone: UTC+01:00 (CET)
  - Summer (DST): UTC+02:00 (CEST)
- INSEE/Postal code: 24544 /24620
- Website: www.tamnies.fr
- ^{1} French Land Register data, which excludes lakes, ponds, glaciers > 1 km^{2} (0.386 sq mi or 247 acres) and river estuaries.

Tamniès (French pronunciation: [tanjɛs]; Occitan: Tanièrs [taˈɲɛs], locally [tɒˈɲe]) is a commune in the Dordogne department in Nouvelle-Aquitaine in southwestern France.

== Population ==
Historical population
Year	Pop.	±% p.a.
1968	316	—
1975	282	−1.61%
1982	284	+0.10%
1990	313	+1.22%
1999	317	+0.14%
2007	318	+0.04%
2012	375	+3.35%
2017	384	+0.48%
2023	414	+1.26%
Source: INSEE

== See also ==
- Communes of the Dordogne department
