= Canton of Sarlat-la-Canéda =

Coordinates: 44.89°N 1.22°E

The canton of Sarlat-la-Canéda is an administrative division of the Dordogne department, southwestern France. Its borders were modified at the French canton reorganisation which came into effect in March 2015. Its seat is in Sarlat-la-Canéda.

It consists of the following communes:

1. Beynac-et-Cazenac
2. Marcillac-Saint-Quentin
3. Marquay
4. Proissans
5. La Roque-Gageac
6. Saint-André-d'Allas
7. Sainte-Nathalène
8. Saint-Vincent-de-Cosse
9. Saint-Vincent-le-Paluel
10. Sarlat-la-Canéda
11. Tamniès
12. Vézac
13. Vitrac
