= Craco =

- Comune
- Comune di Craco
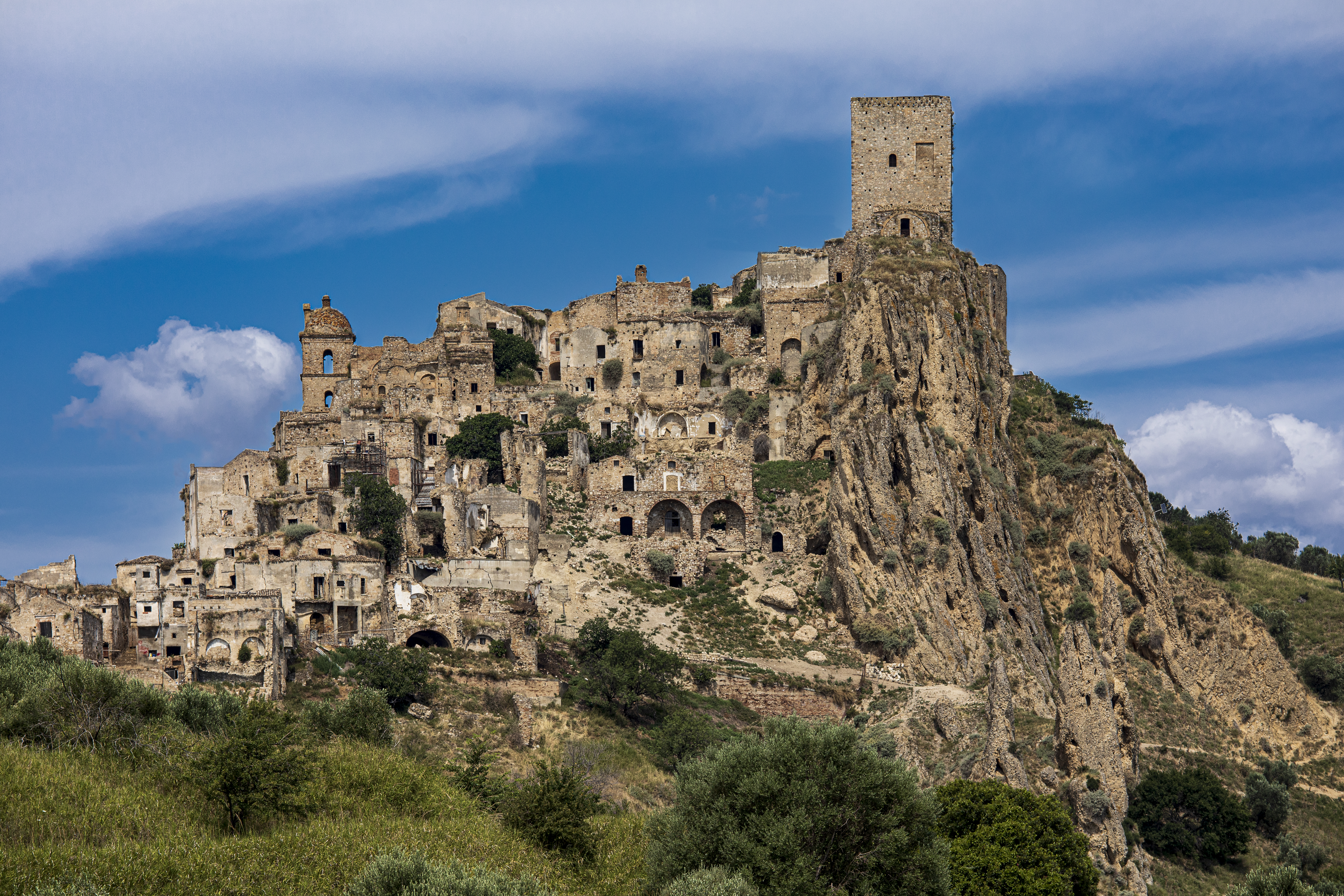
- The old town of Craco

- Location within Italy Location within Basilicata
- Coordinates: 40°22′43″N 16°26′24″E
- Country: Italy
- Region: Basilicata
- Province: Matera (MT)
- Frazioni: Craco Peschiera

Government
  - Mayor: Vincenzo Lacopeta

Area
  - Total: 77.04 km^{2} (29.75 sq mi)
- Elevation: 391 m (1,283 ft)

Population (December 2008)
  - Total: 773
  - Density: 10.0/km^{2} (26.0/sq mi)
- Demonym: Crachesi
- Time zone: UTC+1 (CET)
  - Summer (DST): UTC+2 (CEST)
- Postal code: 75010
- Dialing code: 0835
- ISTAT code: 077007
- Patron saint: San Vincenzo Martire di Craco
- Website: Official website

Craco is a ghost town and comune in the southern Italian region of Basilicata, abandoned after the 1980 Irpinia earthquake. It is a tourist attraction and a popular filming location. In 2010, Craco was included in the watch list of the World Monuments Fund.

== Geography ==
Craco is about 40 km (25 mi) inland from the Gulf of Taranto in the province of Matera. The town was built on a very steep summit for defensive reasons, giving it a striking appearance and distinguishing it from the surrounding land. The centre, built on the highest side of the town, faces a ridge which runs steeply to the southwest, where newer buildings exist. The town sits atop a 400 m-high (1,300 ft) cliff that overlooks the Cavone River valley. Throughout the area are many vegetation-less mounds called calanchi (badlands) formed by intensive erosion.

== History ==
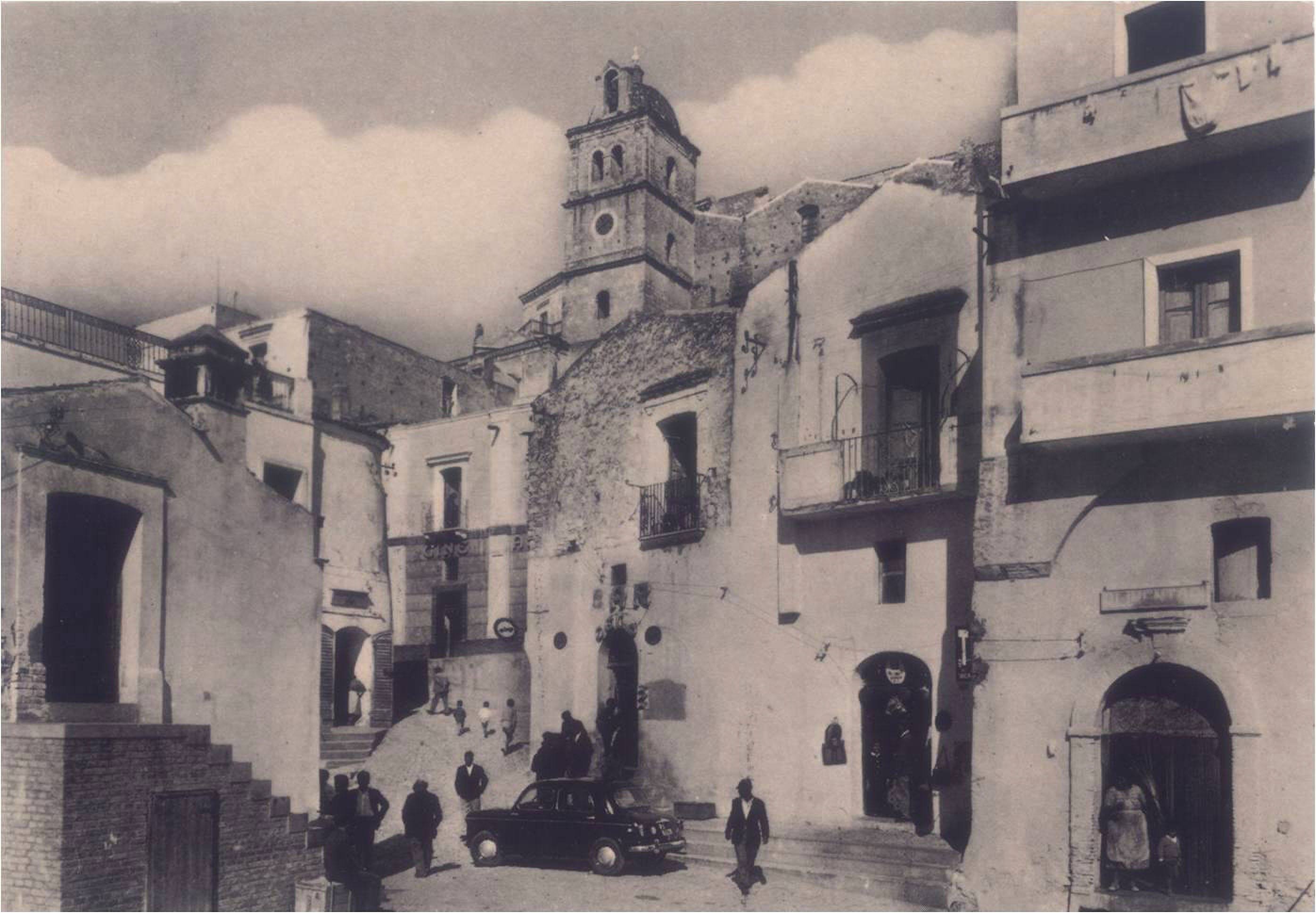
Craco in 1960, 3 years before the landslide disaster

Tombs have been found dating from the 8th century BC. Around 540 BC, the area was inhabited by Ancient Greeks who moved inland from the coastal town of Metaponto. The town's name can be dated to 1060 AD, when the land was the possession of Arnaldo, Archbishop of Tricarico, who called the area Graculum, which means in Latin "little plowed field". This long association of the Church with the town had a great influence on the inhabitants.

From 1154 to 1168, the control of the village passed to a nobleman, Eberto, probably of Norman origin, who established the first feudal control over the town. Then in 1179, Roberto of Pietrapertosa became the landlord of Craco. Under Frederick II, Craco was an important military center and the Castle Tower hosted the Lombard prisoners who fought against the Holy Roman Emperor.

In 1276, a university was established in the town. The population increased from 450 (1277), to 655 (1477), to 1,718 (1532), until reaching 2,590 in 1561; and averaged 1,500 in succeeding centuries. By the 15th century, four large palazzi had developed in the town: Palazzo Maronna near the tower, Palazzo Grossi near the big church, Palazzo Carbone on the Rigirones property, and Palazzo Simonetti. During 1656, a plague struck, with hundreds dying and reducing the number of families in the town.

By 1799, with the proclamation of the Parthenopean Republic, the townspeople overthrew the Bourbon feudal system. Innocenzo De Cesare returned to Naples, where he had studied, and promoted an independent municipality. The republican revolution was repressed by the army of Holy Faith few months later and Craco returned under the Bourbon monarchy. Subsequently, the town fell under the control of the Napoleonic occupation. Bands of brigands, supported by the Bourbon government in exile, attacked Craco on 18 July 1807, plundering and killing the pro-French notables.

By 1815, the town was large enough to divide into two districts: Torrevecchia, the highest area adjacent to the castle and tower; and Quarter della Chiesa Madre, the area adjacent to San Nicola's Church. After the unification of Italy, in 1861 Craco was conquered by the bands of brigands headed by Carmine Crocco.

With the end of the civil strife, the greatest difficulty the town faced became environmental and geological. From 1892 to 1922, over 1,300 Crachesi migrated to North America mainly due to poor agricultural conditions. In 1963, Craco began to be evacuated due to a series of landslides and the inhabitants moved to the valley of Craco Peschiera. The landslides seem to have been provoked by works of infrastructure, sewer and water systems. In 1972 a flood worsened the situation further, preventing a possible repopulation of the historic centre. After the 1980 Irpinia earthquake, the ancient site of Craco was completely abandoned.

In 2007, the descendants of the emigrants of Craco in the United States formed the "Craco Society", a non-profit organization which preserves the culture, traditions, and history of the comune.

== In popular culture ==
=== Cinema ===
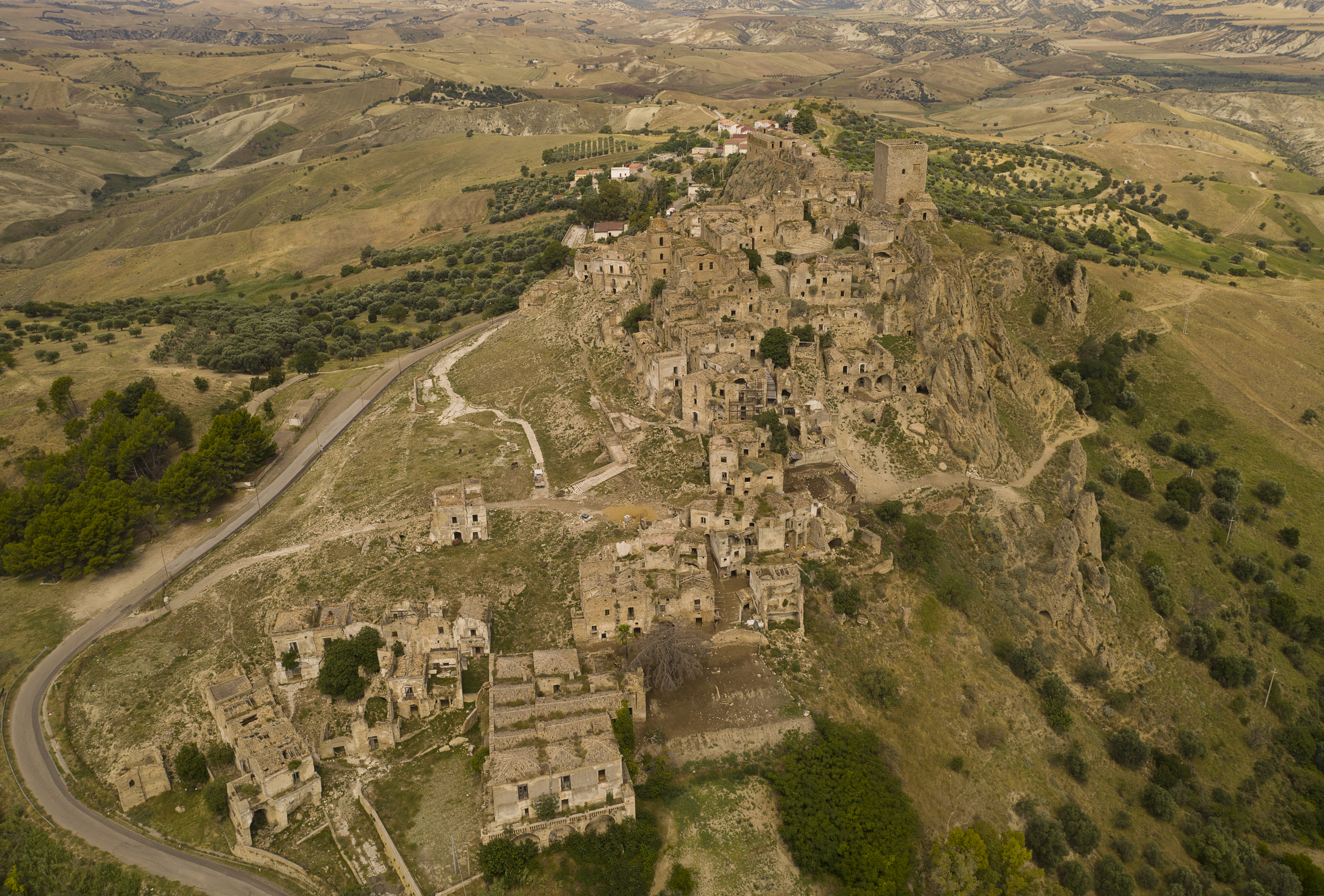
An aerial view of Craco

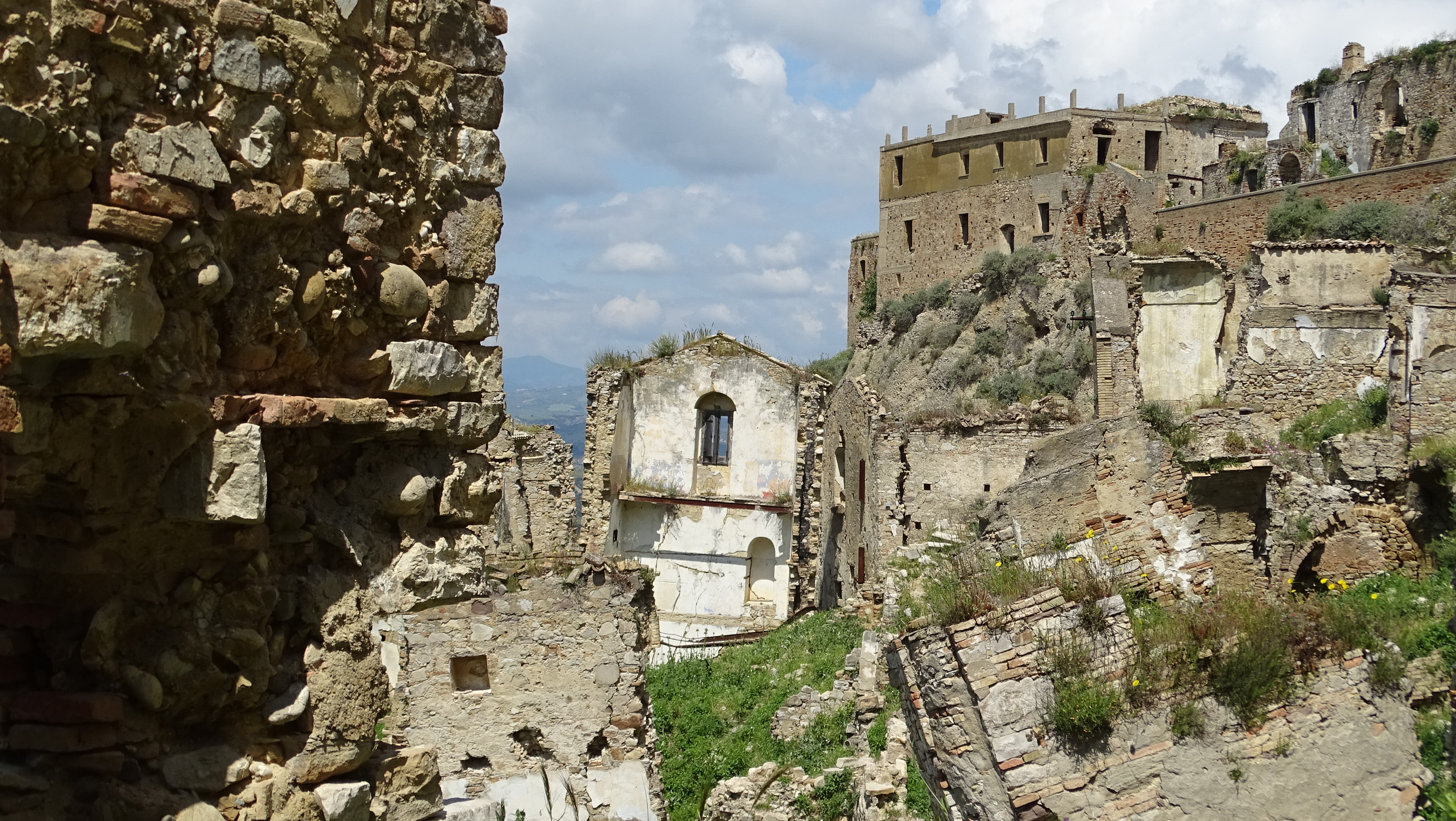
Ruins of Craco

Craco has been used as a filming location for several movies including

- La lupa (1953), dir. by Alberto Lattuada
- Christ Stopped at Eboli (1979), dir. by Francesco Rosi
- King David (1985), dir. by Bruce Beresford
- Saving Grace (1986), dir. by Robert M. Young
- The Sun Also Shines at Night (1990), dir. by Paolo and Vittorio Taviani
- The Nymph (1996), dir. by Lina Wertmüller
- The Passion of the Christ (2004), dir. by Mel Gibson.
- The Nativity Story (2006), dir. by Catherine Hardwicke
- Quantum of Solace (2008), dir. by Marc Forster
- Basilicata Coast to Coast (2010), dir. by Rocco Papaleo
- France (2021), dir. by Bruno Dumont

=== Television ===
- The ancient site has been one of the filming sets for the Italian TV series Classe di ferro (1989–1991), by Bruno Corbucci.
- Craco has been chosen among the locations for the Brazilian telenovela O Rei do Gado (1996–1997), directed by Luiz Fernando Carvalho.

=== Music ===
- French folk band Ödland filmed at Craco the video clip for the song "Santa Lucia", from the album Sankta Lucia (2011).
- German composer Hauschka wrote the song "Craco", from the album Abandoned City (2014).
- A music video for "Paradise" (2020) by Italian dance project Meduza featuring Dermot Kennedy took place in Craco.

== People ==
- Vincenzo, Martyr of Craco
- Director David O. Russell's maternal grandfather was originally from Craco

== See also ==
- 2010 World Monuments Watch
