= San Vicente =

San Vicente is Spanish for Saint Vincent.

San Vicente may also refer to:

== Places ==
=== Argentina ===
- San Vicente, Buenos Aires
- San Vicente, Misiones
- San Vicente Partido

=== Bolivia ===
- San Vicente Canton, Bolivia and its seat San Vicente

=== Chile ===
- San Vicente de Tagua Tagua

=== Colombia ===
- San Vicente de Chucurí
- San Vicente del Caguán
- San Vicente, Antioquia

=== Costa Rica ===
- San Vicente, Moravia

=== Ecuador ===
- San Vicente, Ecuador
- San Vicente Canton, Ecuador

=== El Salvador ===
- San Vicente, El Salvador
- San Vicente Department
- San Vicente (volcano)

=== Mexico ===
- San Vicente Coatlán, Oaxaca
- San Vicente Lachixio, Oaxaca
- San Vicente Nuñu, Oaxaca
- Misión San Vicente Ferrer, Baja California
- San Vicente Palapa, Guerrero

=== Northern Mariana Islands ===
- San Vicente, Saipan

=== Philippines ===
- San Vicente Ferrer Chapel, Catholic Chapel in the municipality of Angono in the Rizal province
- San Vicente, a barangay of the municipality of Angono in the Rizal province
- San Vicente, Camarines Norte
- San Vicente, Ilocos Sur
- San Vicente, Palawan
- San Vicente, Northern Samar
- San Vicente, San Jose, Camarines Sur
- San Vicente, Ubay, Bohol
- San Vicente, Tubajon, Dinagat Islands

=== Spain ===
- San Vicente de Alcántara
- San Vicente del Raspeig
- San Vicente de la Barquera
- San Vicente de Oviedo, church in Oviedo
- San Vicente do Mar

=== United States ===
- San Vicente Creek (San Diego County)
- San Vicente Creek (San Mateo County)
- San Vicente Creek (Santa Cruz County)
- San Vicente Boulevard, Los Angeles, California
- San Vicente Boulevard (Santa Monica), California
- San Vicente Mountain Park, Los Angeles, California

== See also ==
- Saint Vincent (disambiguation)
- São Vicente (disambiguation)
