= Proissans =

- Commune
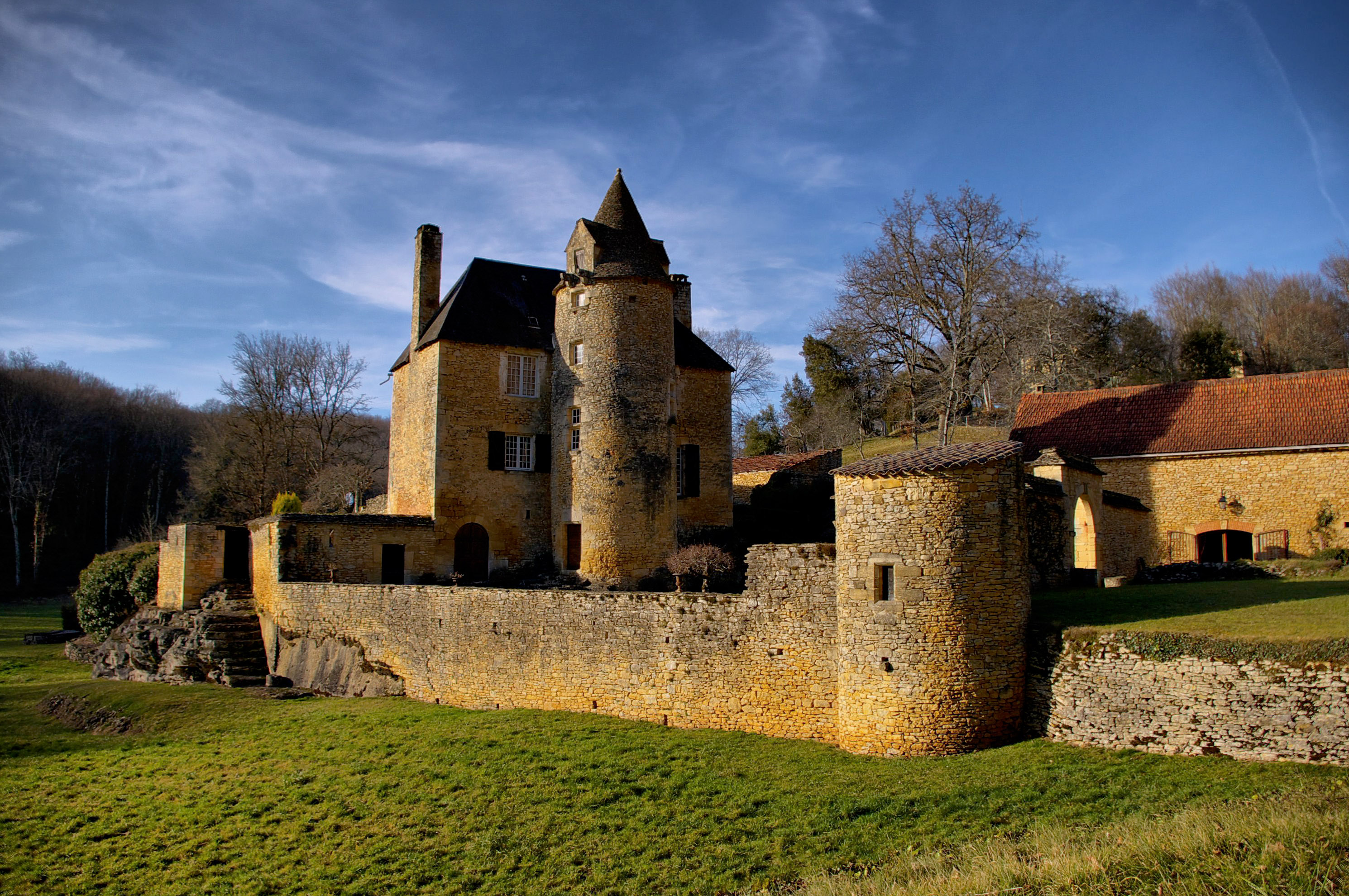
- The Cluzeau Manor in Proissans
- Location of Proissans
- Location within France Location within Nouvelle-Aquitaine
- Coordinates: 44°56′08″N 1°15′12″E
- Country: France
- Region: Nouvelle-Aquitaine
- Department: Dordogne
- Arrondissement: Sarlat-la-Canéda
- Canton: Sarlat-la-Canéda

Government
  - Mayor (2020–2026): Benoît Secrestat
- Area^{1}: 17.56 km^{2} (6.78 sq mi)
- Elevation: 187 m (614 ft)
- Highest elevation: 314 m (1,030 ft)
- Lowest elevation: 118 m (387 ft)
- Population (2023): 1,102
  - Density: 62.76/km^{2} (162.5/sq mi)
- Time zone: UTC+01:00 (CET)
  - Summer (DST): UTC+02:00 (CEST)
- INSEE/Postal code: 24341 /24200
- ^{1} French Land Register data, which excludes lakes, ponds, glaciers > 1 km^{2} (0.386 sq mi or 247 acres) and river estuaries.

Proissans is a commune in the Dordogne department in Nouvelle-Aquitaine in southwestern France.

== Population ==
Historical population
Year	Pop.	±% p.a.
1968	520	—
1975	500	−0.56%
1982	591	+2.42%
1990	692	+1.99%
1999	761	+1.06%
2007	868	+1.66%
2012	953	+1.89%
2017	1,022	+1.41%
2023	1,102	+1.26%
Source: INSEE

The classical trumpeter Pierre Thibaud (22 June 1929 – 29 October 2004) was born in Proissans.

== See also ==
- Communes of the Dordogne department
