= Vitrac, Dordogne =

Vitrac
- Commune
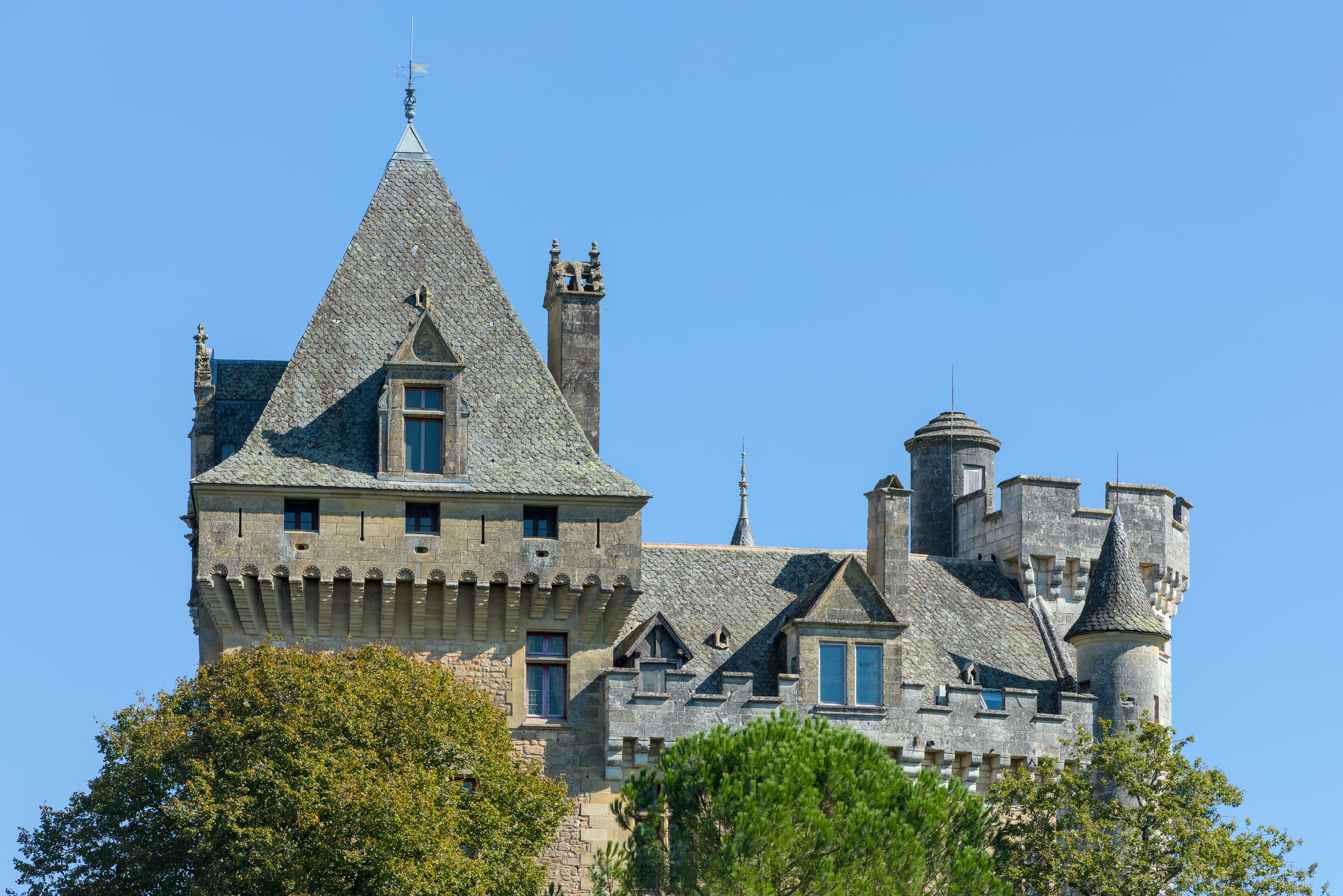
- Château de Montfort

- Coat of arms
- Location of Vitrac
- Location within France Location within Nouvelle-Aquitaine
- Coordinates: 44°49′53″N 1°13′41″E
- Country: France
- Region: Nouvelle-Aquitaine
- Department: Dordogne
- Arrondissement: Sarlat-la-Canéda
- Canton: Sarlat-la-Canéda
- Intercommunality: Sarlat-Périgord Noir

Government
  - Mayor (2020–2026): Frédéric Traverse
- Area^{1}: 14.38 km^{2} (5.55 sq mi)
- Elevation: 140 m (460 ft)
- Highest elevation: 243 m (797 ft)
- Lowest elevation: 60 m (200 ft)
- Population (2023): 863
  - Density: 60.0/km^{2} (155/sq mi)
- Time zone: UTC+01:00 (CET)
  - Summer (DST): UTC+02:00 (CEST)
- INSEE/Postal code: 24587 /24200
- ^{1} French Land Register data, which excludes lakes, ponds, glaciers > 1 km^{2} (0.386 sq mi or 247 acres) and river estuaries.

Vitrac (French pronunciation: [vitʁak]) is a commune in the Dordogne department in Nouvelle-Aquitaine in southwestern France. The Château de Montfort is situated in the commune.

== Population ==
Historical population
Year	Pop.	±% p.a.
1968	550	—
1975	622	+1.77%
1982	631	+0.21%
1990	743	+2.06%
1999	767	+0.35%
2007	835	+1.07%
2012	885	+1.17%
2017	800	−2.00%
2023	863	+1.27%
Source: INSEE

== See also ==
- Communes of the Dordogne department
