= The Raising of Lazarus (Champaigne) =

Painting by Philippe de Champaigne

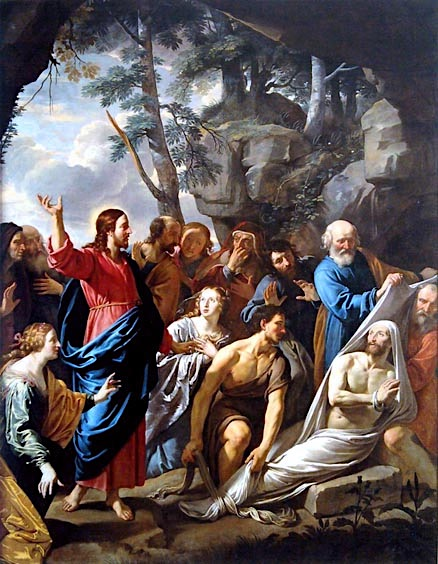
The Raising of Lazarus (1633) by Philippe de Champaigne

The Raising of Lazarus is a 1633 oil painting on canvas by the French painter Philippe de Champaigne, on long-term loan from the Louvre to the Museum of Grenoble, which also holds that artist's The Assumption, to which it was a pendant.

It was painted to hang in the nave of the church of the Carmel de l'Annonciation on rue Saint-Jacques at Paris. It has been French state property since 1799.

== Loans ==
- Philippe de Champaigne, entre politique et dévotion : Lille (France), Palais des Beaux-Arts de Lille, 27 April 2007 – 15 August 2007 and Geneva, Rath Museum, 22 September 2007 – 13 January 2008.
