= Saint-André-d'Allas =

Saint-André-Allas
- Commune
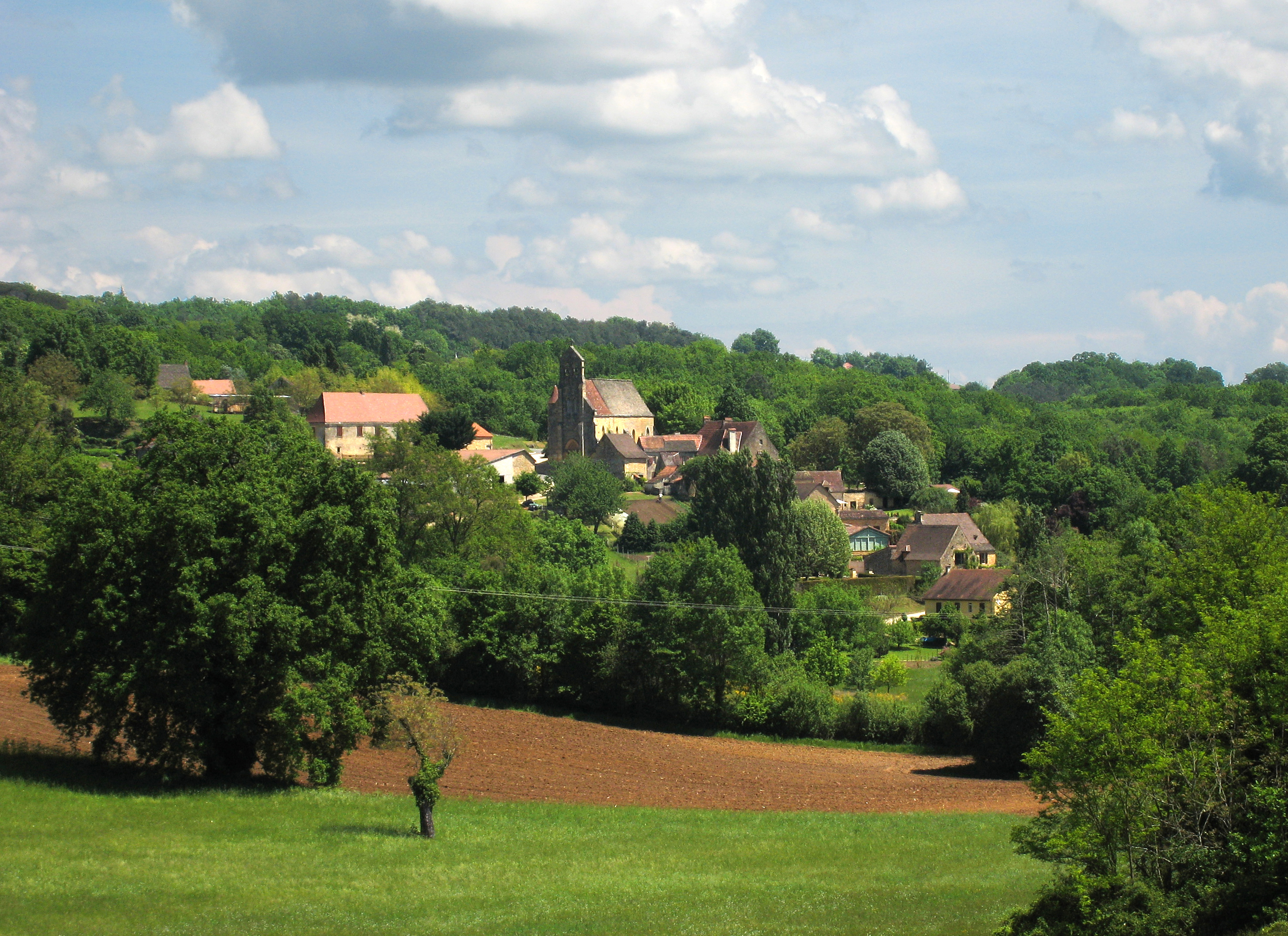
- A general view of Saint-André-d'Allas

- Coat of arms
- Location of Saint-André-Allas
- Location within France Location within Nouvelle-Aquitaine
- Coordinates: 44°53′12″N 1°10′03″E
- Country: France
- Region: Nouvelle-Aquitaine
- Department: Dordogne
- Arrondissement: Sarlat-la-Canéda
- Canton: Sarlat-la-Canéda

Government
  - Mayor (2020–2026): Patrick Salinié
- Area^{1}: 28.77 km^{2} (11.11 sq mi)
- Elevation: 136 m (446 ft)
- Highest elevation: 287 m (942 ft)
- Lowest elevation: 106 m (348 ft)
- Population (2023): 888
  - Density: 30.9/km^{2} (79.9/sq mi)
- Time zone: UTC+01:00 (CET)
  - Summer (DST): UTC+02:00 (CEST)
- INSEE/Postal code: 24366 /24200
- ^{1} French Land Register data, which excludes lakes, ponds, glaciers > 1 km^{2} (0.386 sq mi or 247 acres) and river estuaries.

Saint-André-Allas (French pronunciation: [sɛ̃t‿ɑ̃dʁe dalas]) is a commune in the Dordogne department in Nouvelle-Aquitaine in southwestern France.

== Population ==
Historical population
Year	Pop.	±% p.a.
1968	355	—
1975	351	−0.16%
1982	444	+3.41%
1990	529	+2.21%
1999	592	+1.26%
2007	711	+2.32%
2012	817	+2.82%
2017	833	+0.39%
2023	888	+1.07%
Source: INSEE

== See also ==
- Communes of the Dordogne department
