= São Vicente =

São Vicente may refer to:

== Africa ==
- São Vicente, Cape Verde, an island in Cape Verde
- São Vicente, Guinea-Bissau, a village in Guinea-Bissau

== Brazil ==
- São Vicente, São Paulo, the first permanent Portuguese settlement in the Americas
- São Vicente Island (São Paulo, Brazil), island in the São Paulo state
- São Vicente, Rio Grande do Norte
- São Vicente Ferrer, Pernambuco
- São Vicente Ferrer, Maranhão
- São Vicente de Minas, Minas Gerais
- São Vicente do Sul, Rio Grande do Sul

== Portugal ==
- São Vicente (Abrantes), a parish in the municipality of Abrantes
- São Vicente (Braga), a parish in the municipality of Braga
- São Vicente (Lisbon), a civil parish
- São Vicente Ferreira, a parish in the municipality of Ponta Delgada
- São Vicente, Madeira, a parish and a municipality in Madeira
- Cabo de São Vicente, Cape St. Vincent
- Monastery of São Vicente de Fora, a church and royal mausoleum in Lisbon
- São Vicente (Chaves), a parish in the municipality of Chaves
- São Vicente (Guarda), a parish in the municipality of Guarda

== See also ==
- Saint Vincent (disambiguation)
- San Vicente (disambiguation)
