= Marcillac-Saint-Quentin =

- Commune
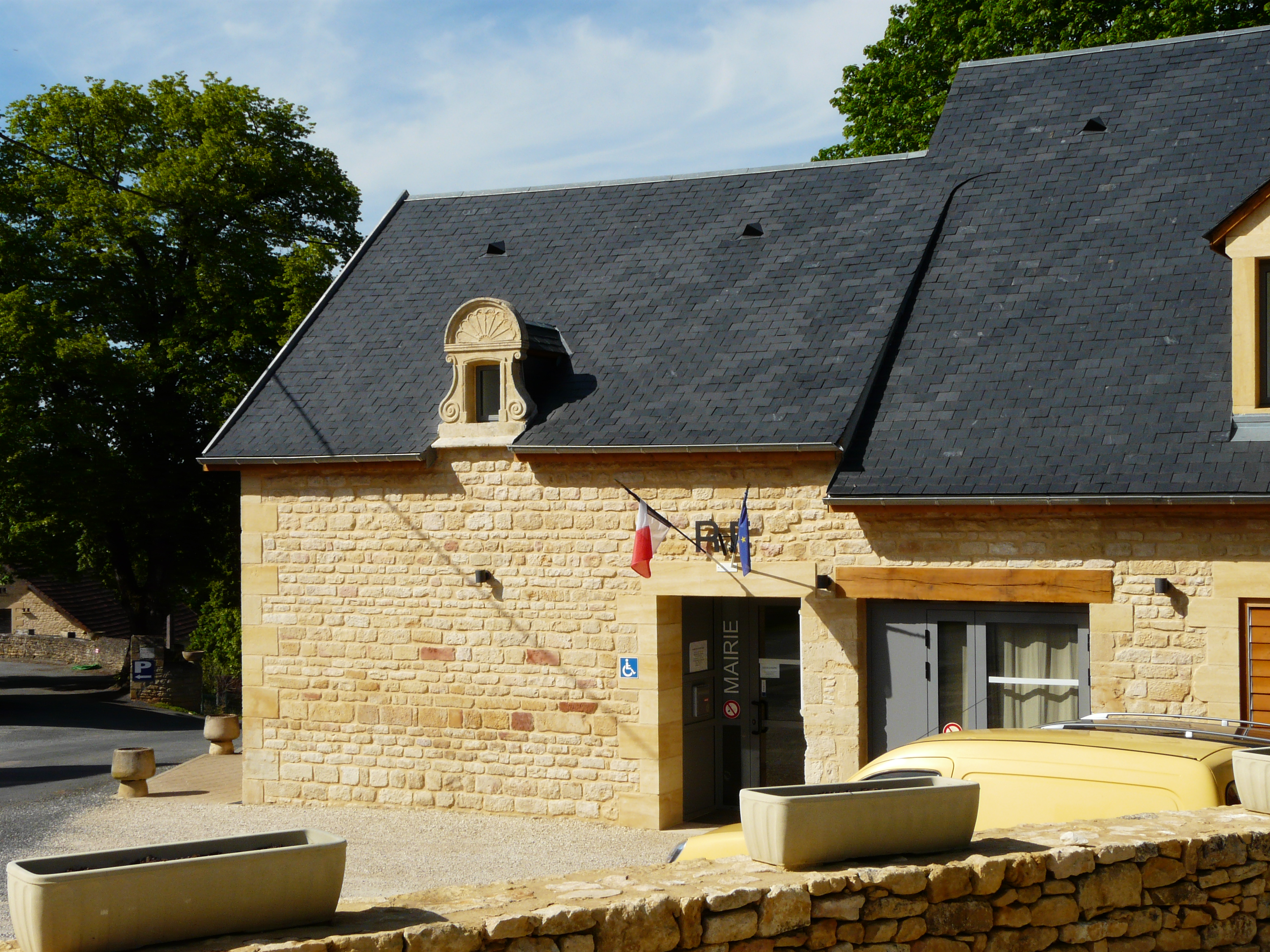
- The town hall in Marcillac-Saint-Quentin
- Location of Marcillac-Saint-Quentin
- Location within France Location within Nouvelle-Aquitaine
- Coordinates: 44°57′05″N 1°12′50″E
- Country: France
- Region: Nouvelle-Aquitaine
- Department: Dordogne
- Arrondissement: Sarlat-la-Canéda
- Canton: Sarlat-la-Canéda

Government
  - Mayor (2020–2026): Michel André
- Area^{1}: 16.46 km^{2} (6.36 sq mi)
- Elevation: 231 m (758 ft)
- Highest elevation: 327 m (1,073 ft)
- Lowest elevation: 121 m (397 ft)
- Population (2023): 826
  - Density: 50.2/km^{2} (130/sq mi)
- Time zone: UTC+01:00 (CET)
  - Summer (DST): UTC+02:00 (CEST)
- INSEE/Postal code: 24252 /24200
- ^{1} French Land Register data, which excludes lakes, ponds, glaciers > 1 km^{2} (0.386 sq mi or 247 acres) and river estuaries.

Marcillac-Saint-Quentin (French pronunciation: [maʁsijak sɛ̃ kɑ̃tɛ̃]; Languedocien: Marcilhac e Sent Quentin) is a commune in the Dordogne department in Nouvelle-Aquitaine in southwestern France.

== Population ==
Historical population
Year	Pop.	±% p.a.
1968	406	—
1975	407	+0.04%
1982	454	+1.57%
1990	598	+3.50%
1999	664	+1.17%
2007	769	+1.85%
2012	797	+0.72%
2017	792	−0.13%
2023	826	+0.70%
Source: INSEE

== See also ==
- Communes of the Dordogne department
