= Château de Montfort =

Castle in southwestern France

Coordinates: 44°50′15″N 1°14′57″E

The Château de Montfort is a castle in the French commune of Vitrac in the Dordogne département, part of the region of Nouvelle-Aquitaine.

The castle clings to a promontory overlooking the Cingle de Montfort (Montfort Meander) on the Dordogne. Its grandiose setting "aroused the envy of those who wished to rule Périgord" so that its history is a long series of battles and sieges. It was taken and razed to the ground by order of Simon de Montfort in 1214. Abbot Guy of Vaux-de-Cernay led the demolition party. The castle was later rebuilt, but again destroyed another three times: during the Hundred Years' War, under Louis XI of France and on the instructions of Henri IV of France.

Renovation work was carried out in the 19th century and gives the castle a "whimsical look of a stage setting for light opera."

== Gallery ==
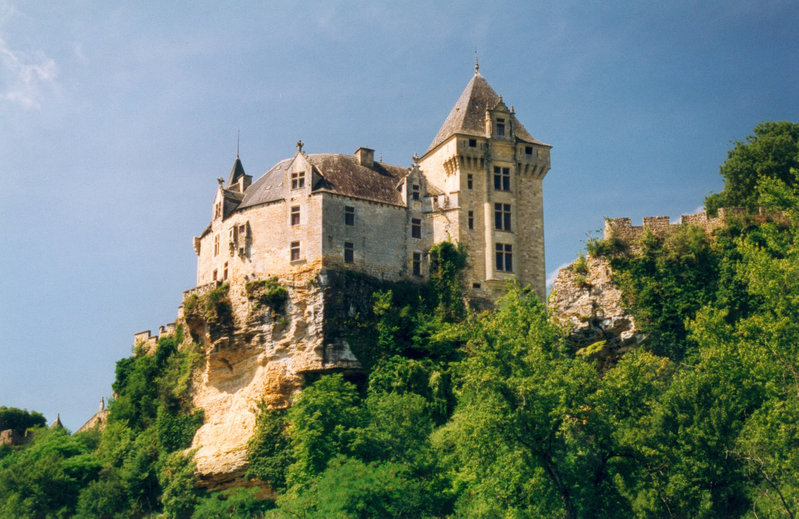

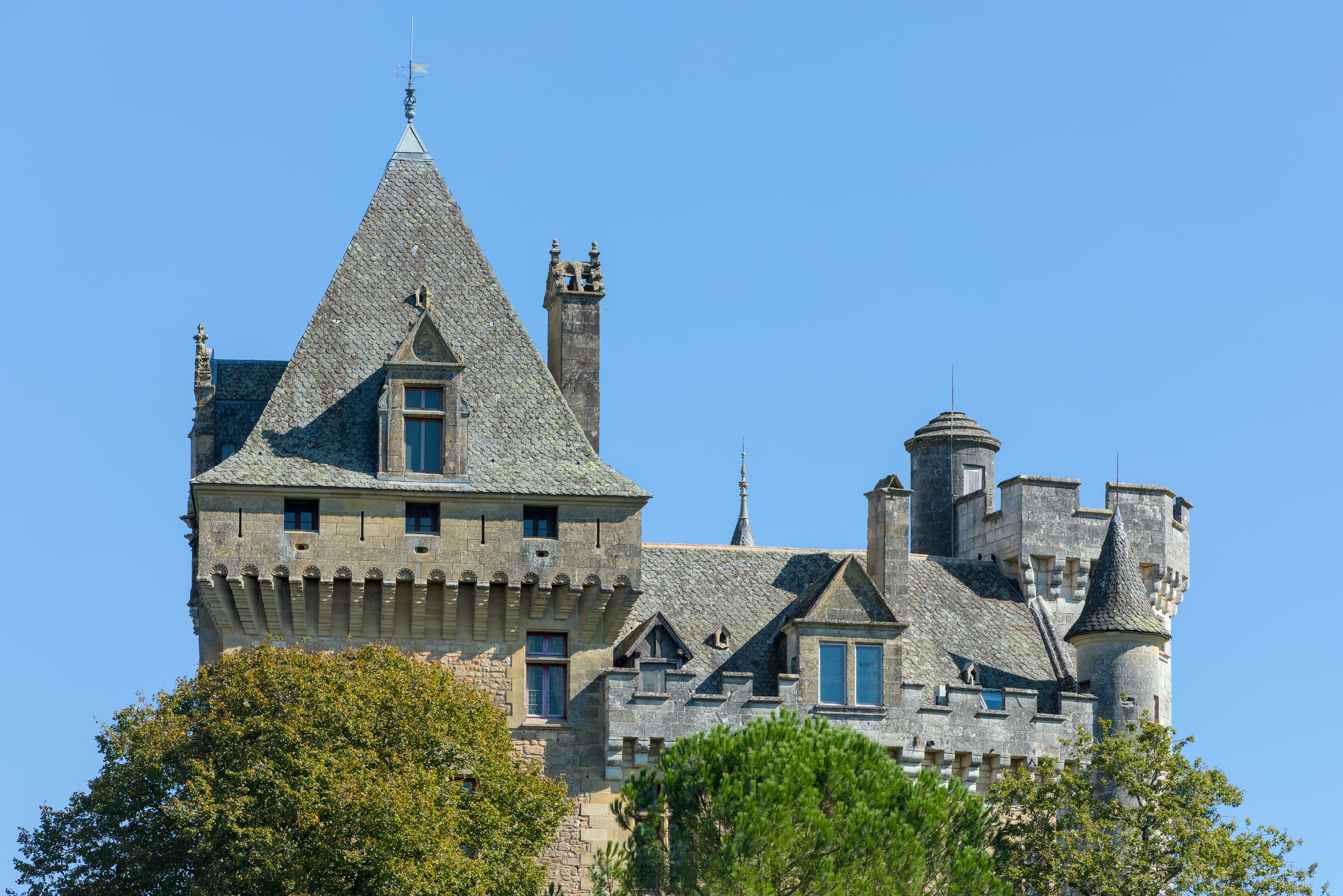

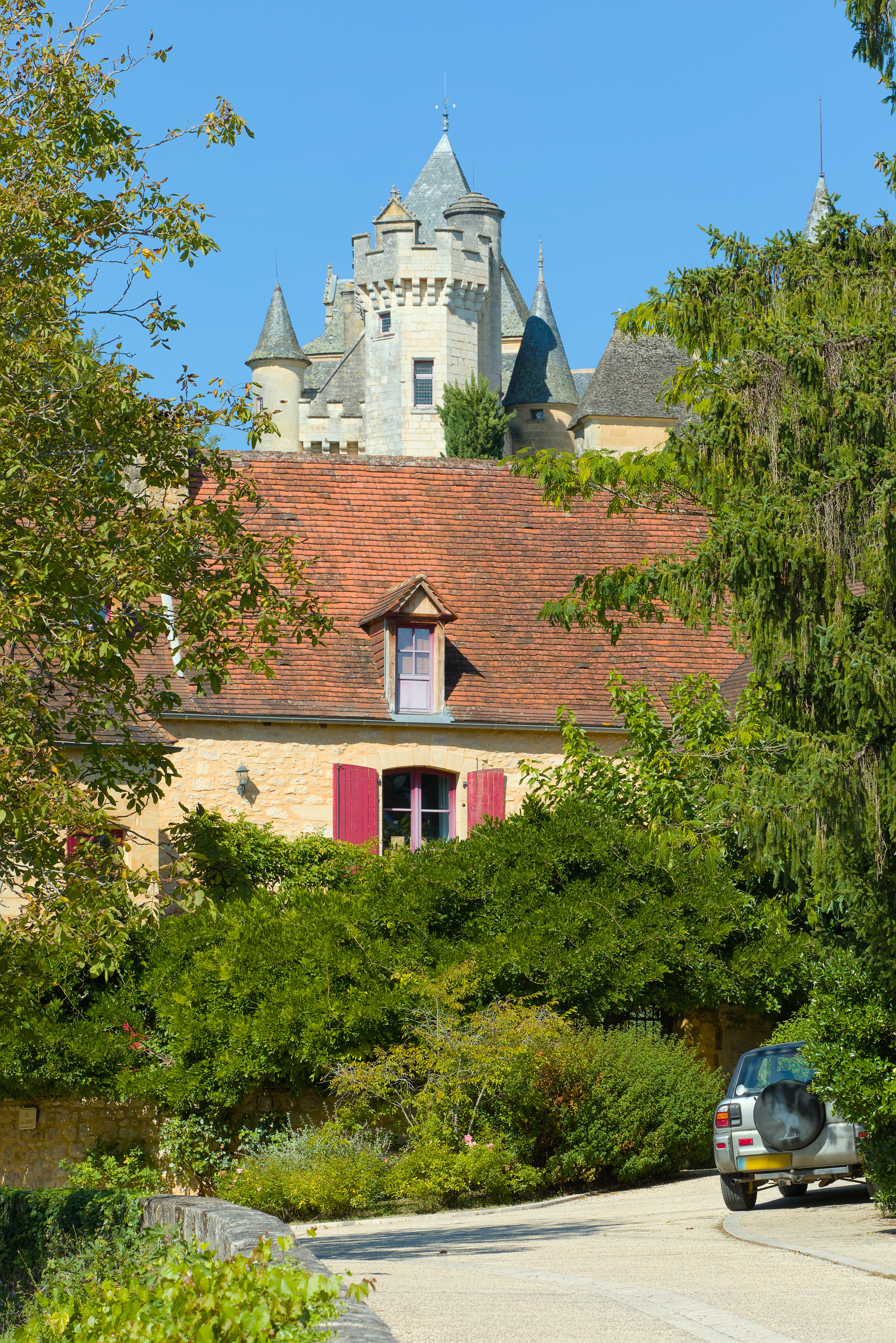

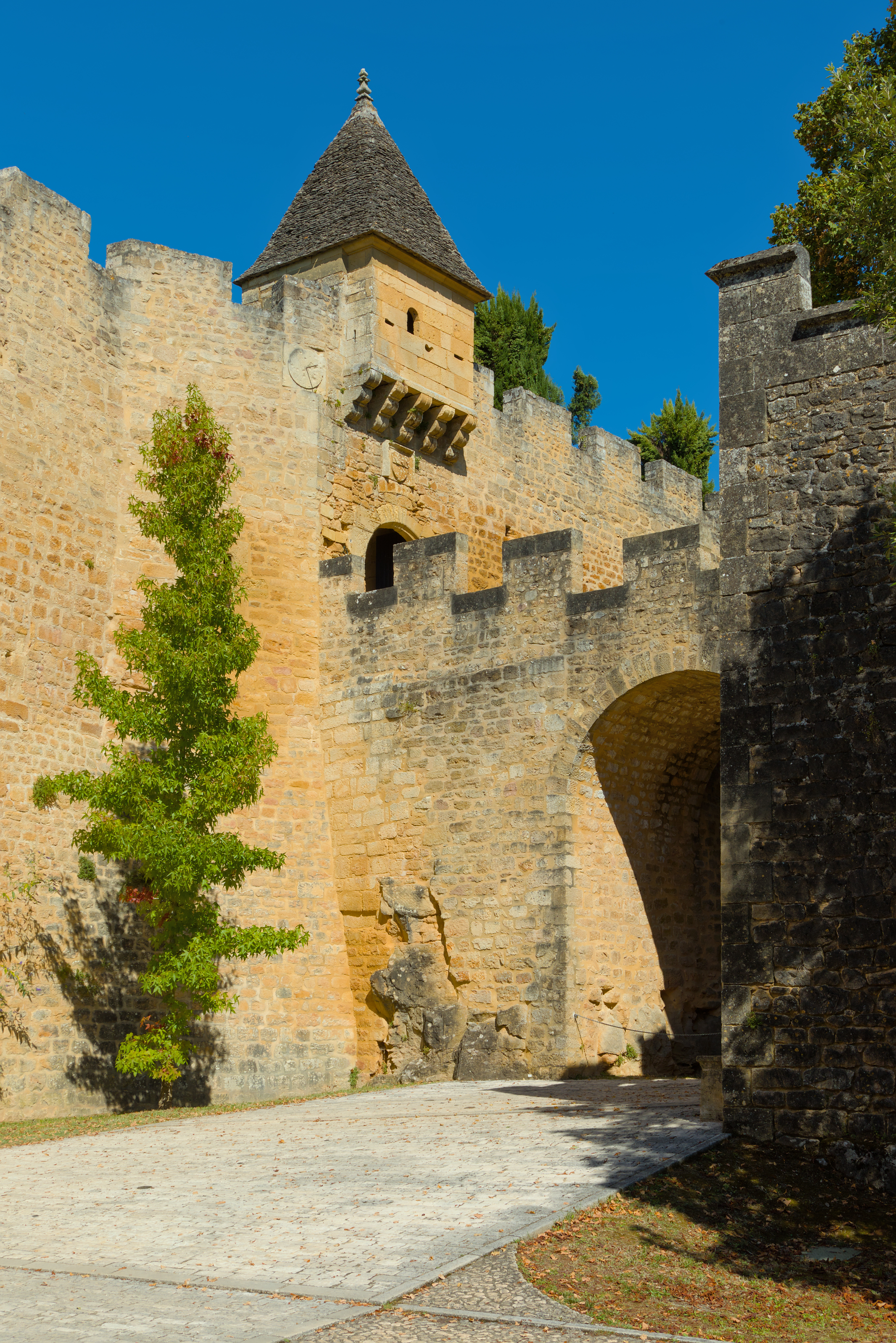

== See also ==
- List of castles in France
