= Saint-Vincent-de-Durfort =

- Commune
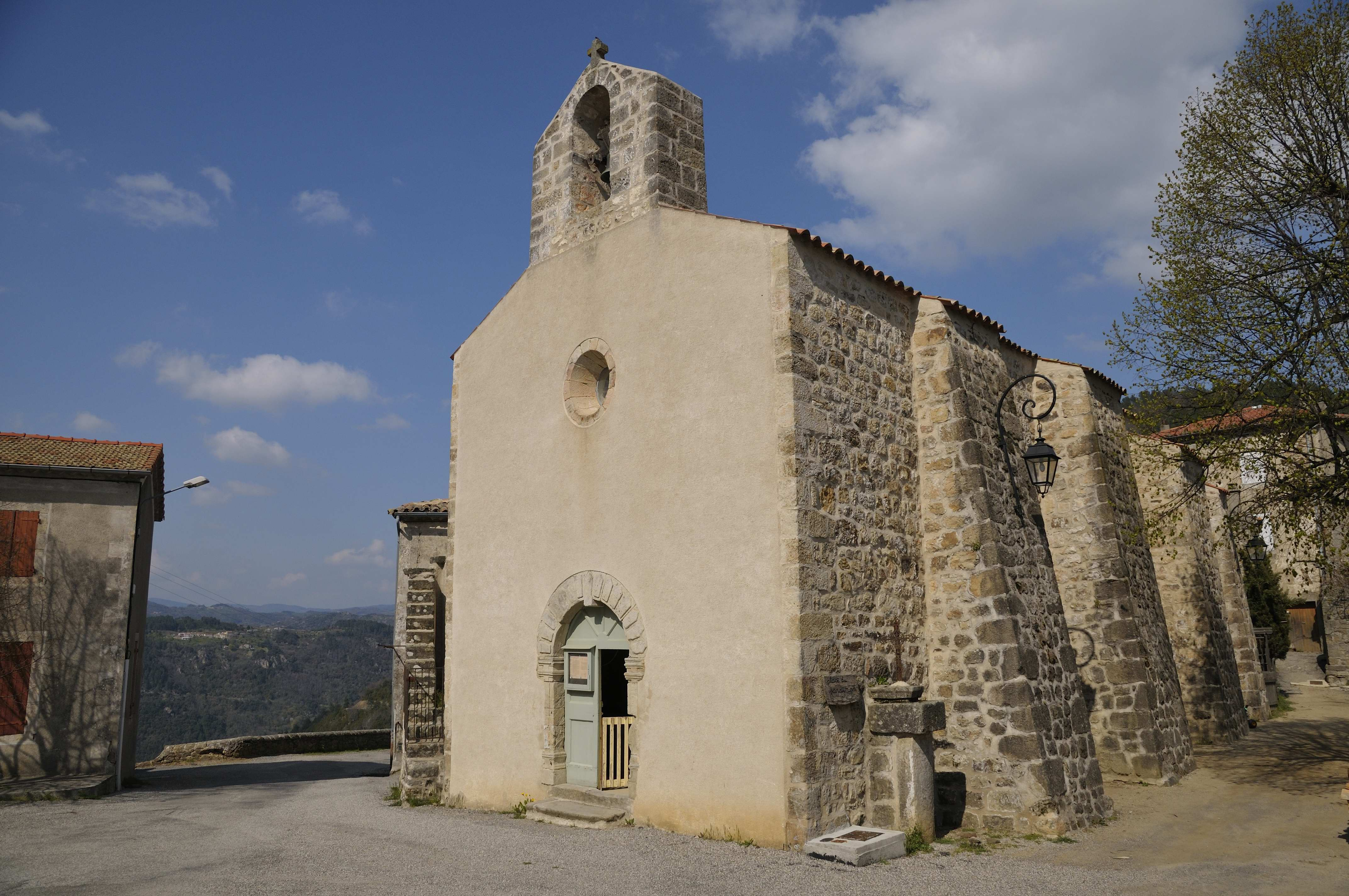
- The church in Saint-Vincent-de-Durfort
- Location of Saint-Vincent-de-Durfort
- Location within France Location within Auvergne-Rhône-Alpes
- Coordinates: 44°48′22″N 4°38′41″E
- Country: France
- Region: Auvergne-Rhône-Alpes
- Department: Ardèche
- Arrondissement: Privas
- Canton: Haut-Eyrieux
- Intercommunality: CA Privas Centre Ardèche

Government
  - Mayor (2020–2026): Anne Terrot Dontenwill
- Area^{1}: 12.52 km^{2} (4.83 sq mi)
- Elevation: 320 m (1,050 ft)
- Highest elevation: 829 m (2,720 ft)
- Lowest elevation: 153 m (502 ft)
- Population (2023): 274
  - Density: 21.9/km^{2} (56.7/sq mi)
- Time zone: UTC+01:00 (CET)
  - Summer (DST): UTC+02:00 (CEST)
- INSEE/Postal code: 07303 /07360
- ^{1} French Land Register data, which excludes lakes, ponds, glaciers > 1 km^{2} (0.386 sq mi or 247 acres) and river estuaries.

Saint-Vincent-de-Durfort (French pronunciation: [sɛ̃ vɛ̃sɑ̃ də dyʁfɔʁ]; Vivaro-Alpine: Sant Vincent de Durfort) is a commune in the Ardèche department in southern France.

== Population ==
Historical population
Year	Pop.	±% p.a.
1968	189	—
1975	159	−2.44%
1982	141	−1.70%
1990	163	+1.83%
1999	213	+3.02%
2007	210	−0.18%
2012	254	+3.88%
2017	225	−2.40%
2023	274	+3.34%
Source: INSEE

== See also ==
- Communes of the Ardèche department
