= Saint-Vincent-le-Paluel =

- Commune
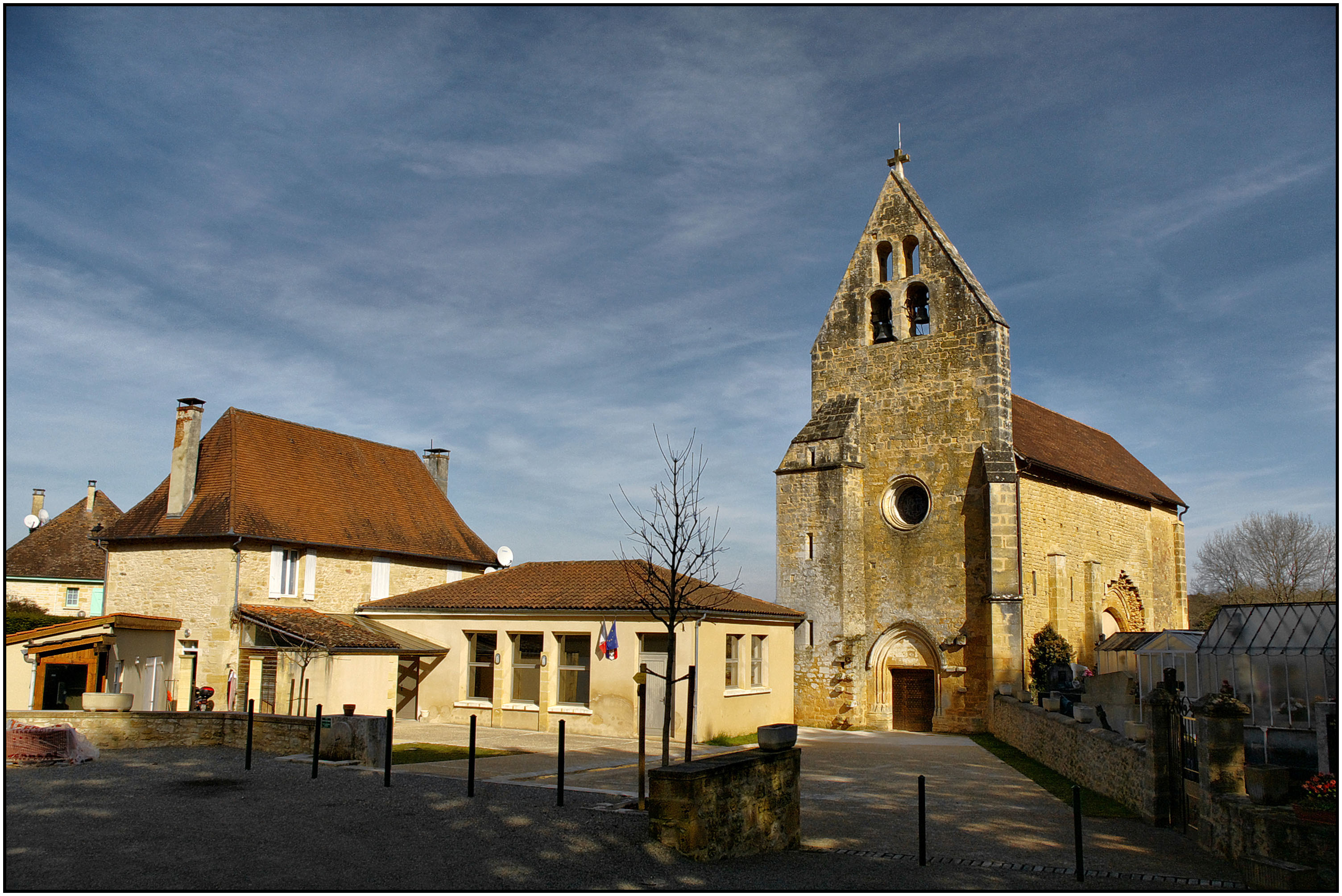
- The town hall and church in Saint-Vincent-le-Paluel
- Location of Saint-Vincent-le-Paluel
- Location within France Location within Nouvelle-Aquitaine
- Coordinates: 44°53′34″N 1°17′12″E
- Country: France
- Region: Nouvelle-Aquitaine
- Department: Dordogne
- Arrondissement: Sarlat-la-Canéda
- Canton: Sarlat-la-Canéda

Government
  - Mayor (2020–2026): Étienne Rouquié
- Area^{1}: 6.86 km^{2} (2.65 sq mi)
- Elevation: 110 m (360 ft)
- Highest elevation: 247 m (810 ft)
- Lowest elevation: 80 m (260 ft)
- Population (2023): 293
  - Density: 42.7/km^{2} (111/sq mi)
- Time zone: UTC+01:00 (CET)
  - Summer (DST): UTC+02:00 (CEST)
- INSEE/Postal code: 24512 /24200
- ^{1} French Land Register data, which excludes lakes, ponds, glaciers > 1 km^{2} (0.386 sq mi or 247 acres) and river estuaries.

Saint-Vincent-le-Paluel (French pronunciation: [sɛ̃ vɛ̃sɑ̃ lə palɥɛl]; Occitan: Sent Vincenç de Paluèl) is a commune in the Dordogne department in Nouvelle-Aquitaine in southwestern France.

== Population ==
Historical population
Year	Pop.	±% p.a.
1968	114	—
1975	109	−0.64%
1982	121	+1.50%
1990	151	+2.81%
1999	207	+3.57%
2007	251	+2.44%
2012	262	+0.86%
2017	276	+1.05%
2023	293	+1.00%
Source: INSEE

== See also ==
- Communes of the Dordogne department
