= St. Vincent's Day Care =

Nonprofit daycare centre

St. Vincent's Day Care Center is a nonprofit daycare agency in Evansville, Indiana under the sponsorship of the Daughters of Charity of St. Vincent de Paul.

== History ==
The history of St Vincent's dates back to the time of World War I. At that time, 1918, women were called upon to assume roles in industry to replace men who had been called to military service. Mothers needed a safe and affordable place for their children to stay while they were at work. The Ladies of Charity of Evansville responded to this need by establishing St. Vincent's Day Nursery. Within a few months, the Ladies of Charity were unable to accommodate the numbers needing day care. They appealed to the Daughters of Charity at St. Mary's hospital to assume the administration of the center.

== History ==
On November 18, 1918, the Ladies of Charity, an organization of Catholic women, established St. Vincent's Day Nursery in response to a growing need for quality care for children of working mothers. First located in the former girls high school building at 121 Upper 7th Street, the Day Nursery served 17 children for $.10 a day. Sister Lucia Dolan, a Daughter of Charity, joined the Day Nursery staff six months later in May 1919.

In August 1919, with 79 children, four Daughters of Charity and other staff, St. Vincent's Day Nursery moved to the Kratz Home at 517 Bond Street, a move made possible in part through the generous support of John Fendrich. Rising costs forced a fee increase in 1921 to $.15 a day.

In August 1930, the William Heilman home at 611 First Avenue became the new home of St. Vincent's Day Nursery. This building was donated by John Fendrich and his sister Laura Fendrich in memory of their parents, Herman and Mary Reitz Fendrich, to further the work of the Ladies of Charity and the Daughters of Charity.

In 1935, St. Vincent's Day Nursery was incorporated as an Indiana charitable non-profit association to care for "poor children whose mothers are obliged to work or for those parents who lack the means to provide the proper care and nourishment for their children at home."

In 1936, St. Vincent's became a member agency of the Community Chest in Evansville through Catholic Charities.

In 1967, the United Fund allocation to St. Vincent's was separated from Catholic Charities and the Day Nursery received its funding as an autonomous agency.

In 1970, St. Vincent's Day Nursery enrollment was 127 children, served by a staff of five Daughters of Charity and 14 lay staff.

In 1973, the organisation's name was changed to St. Vincent's Day Care Center. A satellite center on Cherry Street opened and continued to operate until 1977. By 1974, enrollment was 182, including 20 at the Cherry Street satellite center.

In December 1997, St. Vincent's Day Care Center purchased the next-door Mead Johnson building in order to expand its services to include the care of infants and toddlers. This building was previously home to the School of Nursing for St. Mary's Hospital from 1944 through 1965.

On October 14, 1998, Ground-breaking ceremonies were held to mark the beginning of remodeling and expansion of the newly acquired building. Designed by architects from 31 Engineering and constructed by Deig Brothers, this addition provides 12 classrooms on the first floor. These classrooms serve 18 infants, 30 toddlers, 30 two-year-olds and 80 three- to five-year-old children. With this addition, St. Vincent's full enrollment capabilities have expanded to 303 children from six weeks to six years old. Current enrollment is 230 students.
