= Saint-Vincent-de-Cosse =

- Commune
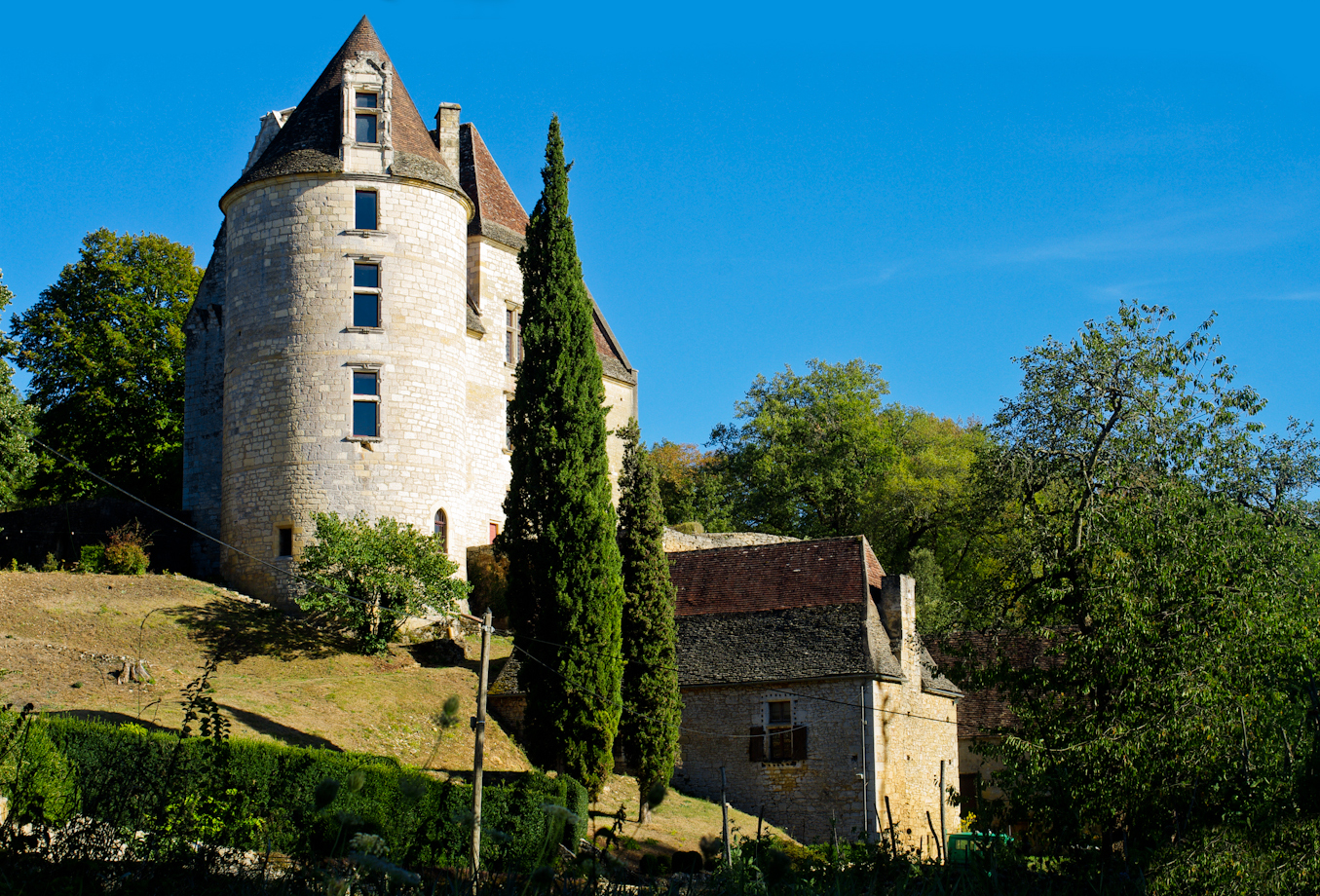
- Chateau of Panassou
- Location of Saint-Vincent-de-Cosse
- Location within France Location within Nouvelle-Aquitaine
- Coordinates: 44°50′35″N 1°07′11″E
- Country: France
- Region: Nouvelle-Aquitaine
- Department: Dordogne
- Arrondissement: Sarlat-la-Canéda
- Canton: Sarlat-la-Canéda

Government
  - Mayor (2022–2026): Antoine Devigne
- Area^{1}: 7.19 km^{2} (2.78 sq mi)
- Elevation: 67 m (220 ft)
- Highest elevation: 265 m (869 ft)
- Lowest elevation: 59 m (194 ft)
- Population (2023): 388
  - Density: 54.0/km^{2} (140/sq mi)
- Time zone: UTC+01:00 (CET)
  - Summer (DST): UTC+02:00 (CEST)
- INSEE/Postal code: 24510 /24220
- ^{1} French Land Register data, which excludes lakes, ponds, glaciers > 1 km^{2} (0.386 sq mi or 247 acres) and river estuaries.

Saint-Vincent-de-Cosse (French pronunciation: [sɛ̃ vɛ̃sɑ̃ də kɔs]; Languedocien: Sent Vincenç de Còssa) is a commune in the Dordogne department in Nouvelle-Aquitaine in southwestern France, on the Dordogne River.

The commune is located 15 km (9.3 mi) south of Sarlat-la-Canéda. It has two church buildings: an original Romanesque twelfth century church, Saint Vincent le Salvadou, and a nineteenth century replacement. It is named for St Vincent de Agen, a local third century saint.

== Population ==
Historical population
Year	Pop.	±% p.a.
1968	319	—
1975	278	−1.95%
1982	314	+1.75%
1990	302	−0.49%
1999	351	+1.68%
2007	378	+0.93%
2012	358	−1.08%
2017	364	+0.33%
2023	388	+1.07%
Source: INSEE

== See also ==
- Communes of the Dordogne department
