= Vincenzo, Martyr of Craco =

Christian martyr and saint

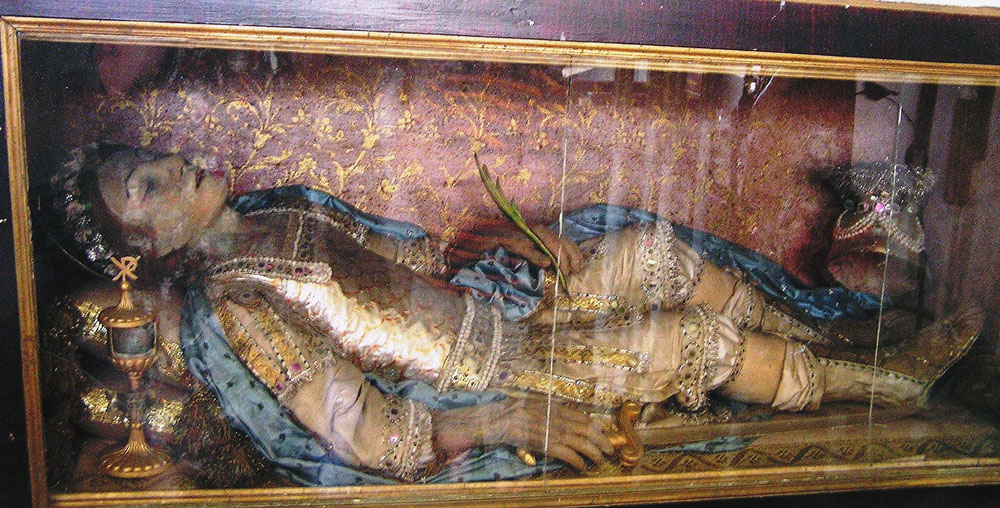
The relic of San Vincenzo in Craco, Italy

San Vincenzo Martire di Craco (Saint Vincent Martyr of Craco) is a minor saint of the Roman Catholic Church. He is remembered in devotions by the people of Craco in the province of Matera, the Basilicata Region, Italy along with immigrants and their descendants from that town who settled in North America. San Vincenzo Martire di Craco's feast day is celebrated on the fourth Sunday of October in Craco, Italy and Manhattan, New York.

== History ==
San Vincenzo is said to have been one of the Theban Legion, a legion of soldiers who converted en masse to Christianity and who were martyred for refusal to participate in sacrifices to the Roman emperor prior to battle in the year 286 AD.

After the Roman Emperor Aurelian died, Diocletian succeeded him and selected Massmiliano (Maximinianus in Latin and Maximilian in English) to rule over part of the empire. In 286AD while Maximilian was on his way to Gaul (France) to quell a revolt of the Bagauds, a peasantry of Belgium, he stopped at the village of Otteduro (which today bears the name of Martigny, Valais, Switzerland) to rest his army.

There he was joined by the Theban Legion, which was summoned by Diocletian to re-enforce the militia. The Theban Legion was recruited in Egypt which was then under Roman rule. They camped near Agauno, at the foot of a mountain, which has a pass called Great St. Bernard, connecting Italy and Switzerland.

The Theban Legion was made up of 6,000 Christian legionnaires. San Maurizio was an officer in command of the Legion and San Vincenzo was among the soldiers in the legion. While camped there, Maximilian issued an order for the entire army to offer sacrifices to the Roman gods for the success of the expedition.

The Theban Legion refused to obey Maximilian's order on the grounds that it was a religious and not a military command. Because of this refusal Maximilian ordered they be decimated, that is, every tenth man would be put to death. The troops filed into ranks and every tenth man was put to the sword. As a result of this slaughter, 600 men were killed.

Maximilian grieved at the useless loss of so many legionnaires and sent a very complaisant message asking the remaining soldiers to sacrifice to the gods. But they replied, “We are soldiers, but we are also servants of the true God. We owe you military service and obedience; but we cannot renounce Him who is our creator and Master. We have taken an oath to God before we took one to you; you can place no confidence in our second oath if we violate the first. We have arms in our hands, but we do not resist, because we would rather die innocent than live in shame.”

Maximilian, amazed at this bold reply, again issued orders for every tenth man to be killed and yet even after this second slaughter the Legionnaires remained constant. Finally, realizing that any threat or punishment of his was useless, he ordered the complete extermination of the Theban Legion at the encampment. San Vincenzo was among those who were slaughtered and given the status of martyr for his faith.

== Devotion ==
The village of Craco, in the modern province of Matera, is the site of a former friary of the Franciscans. The building of the friary began on April 3, 1620, by a Roberto, then Bishop of Tricarico, and was finally completed in 1630. The Friary bore the name of St. Peter, and was entrusted to the care of the Franciscan Friars who retained it until the Italian Government suppressed it in 1866. Today, the building serves as a tourist information center.

Next to this friary was a church to the left of which, in 1777, a rather large chapel was built. This chapel was dedicated to San Vincenzo Martire in the year 1793.

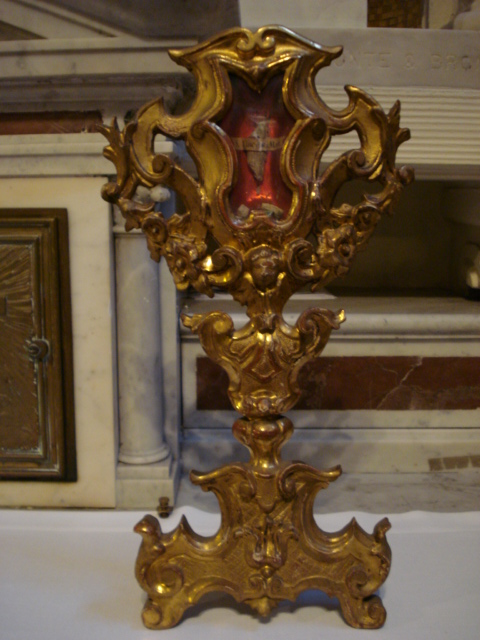
San Vincenzo Reliquary 1769

On February 6, 1769, a small bone relic of San Vincenzo was sent to Craco from Rome. Then in 1792, Fr. Prospero, a Franciscan from Craco, finding himself in Rome, and wishing to return home with a relic of some glorious martyr, obtained from Pope Pius VI, through the Sacred Congregation of Rites, a relic which was said to be that of a Roman soldier as well as a glorious martyr, by the name of Vincenzo – a name signifying "winner" or "conqueror." The "sacred body with a flask of blood" of San Vincenzo Martire was exhumed at the cemetery of St. Ciriaca, in Rome. Fr. Prospero enclosed the precious relic in an artistic crystal-sided casket. Inside the casket was set the waxen body of the martyr, dressed as a Roman soldier and lying in a reclining position.

Stopping at various places during the course of its journey from Rome, the remains were carried all the way to Craco where it was received with great pomp and honor by the local clergy and townspeople. The great devotion of the faithful in the region and neighboring towns rendered great honor to the soldier martyr San Vincenzo. In large measure, this was due to the many miracles reportedly performed by the Saint for the suffering multitudes that sought his help.

The holy relic of San Vincenzo arrived in Craco on June 4, 1792. The clergy and the people of Craco decided to choose San Vincenzo, along with San Nicola of Bari, as their patron and protector of the town. The religious and civil festival of San Vincenzo was fixed for the fourth Sunday of October to coincide with the important annual fair which takes place after the harvest. On April 4, 1793, the relic of San Vincenzo was installed in the chapel at the Friary and remained there until the late 1980s when structural instability required the relic to be relocated to a small chapel in the Sant'Angelo section of Craco where it resided until 2022 when it was relocated to the Chapel of the Madonna della Stella in Craco Vecchio.

Although the Friary dedicated to St. Peter served as his home, the overwhelming majority of the population of Craco still calls it "the Convent of San Vincenzo."

== Feast of San Vincenzo ==
Traditionally, the feast in Craco celebrating San Vincenzo began nine days before the fourth Sunday in October with the recitation of solemn afternoon novenas. On one of those evenings, a small procession took place, with a statue representing the upright figure of the relic, starting from the chapel and moving around the "Cross", then located at the entrance to the town. On Friday evening, after the novena, the statue of the saint was brought into the Chiesa Madre [Church of San Nicola] located in the heart of the old town. On Saturday evening, before the feast day, the statue was carried in procession back to the chapel that served as its home. All celebrations culminated on Sunday with the Mass at the Friary and the procession that crossed the entire town. That evening, in front of the Palazzo Rigirone, there were bright fireworks displays.

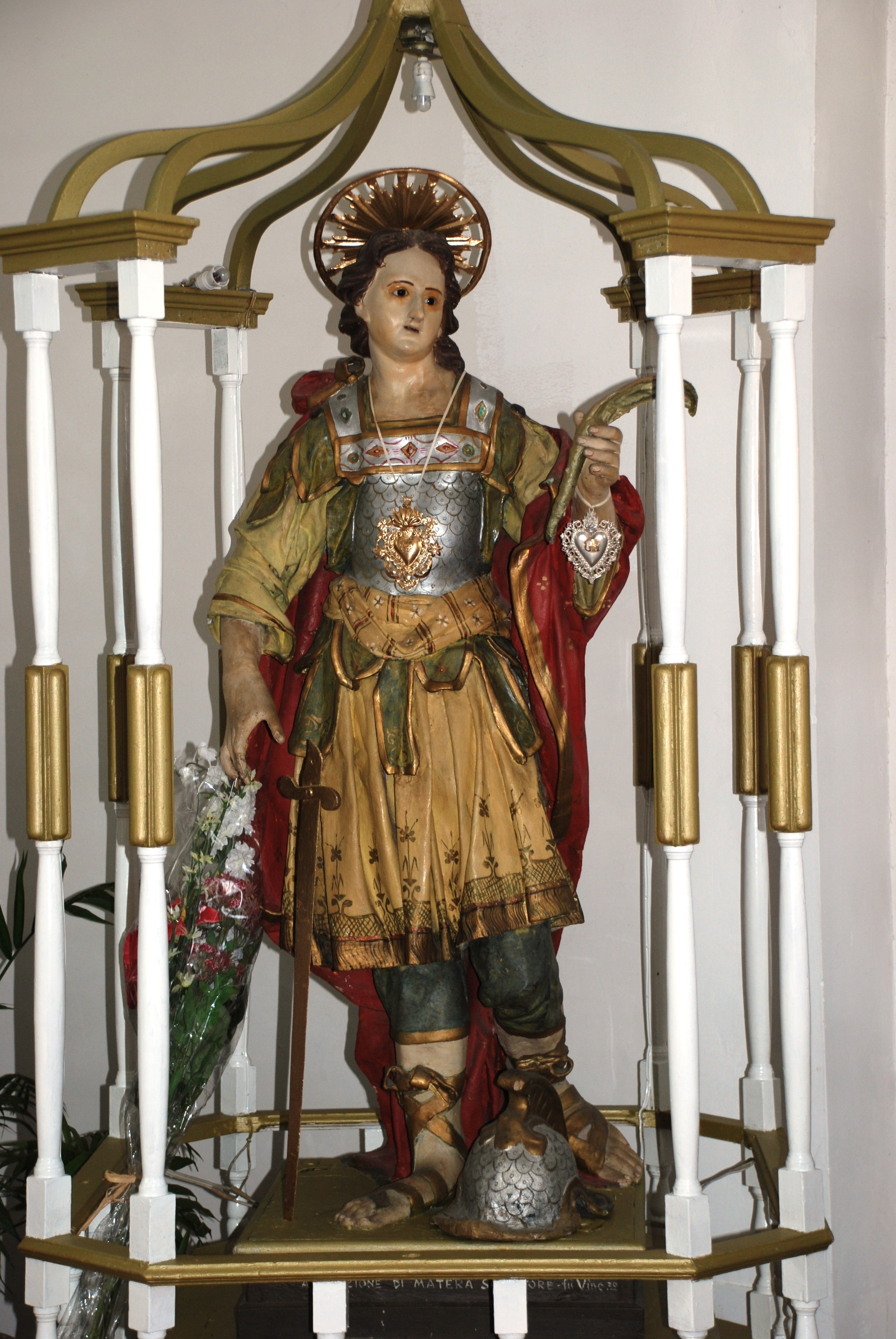
San Vincenzo processional statue in Craco.

== Fair ==
The feast in honor of San Vincenzo was always preceded on the Saturday before by a fair, a proud tradition carried out since the end of the 18th century until today. The fair, traditionally known by all the nearby people and neighboring towns, brought many people from Salandra, Fernandina, Montalbano and Pisticci. The fair branched from the entrance of Craco to the other end of the town, at the drinking trough. It was held at the time of the year when workers of the earth were engaged in preparing land for planting or harvesting olives. But on that day, all work ceased so the people could make major purchases at the fair. Animals of all types, as well as foodstuffs: dried beans, "winter" apples, and dried peppers that would be used to season salami were available. This served as a way for people to purchase provisions for the long winter that awaited the rural population.

== Confraternity of San Vincenzo Martire ==
Until the early decades of the 20th century a confraternity of devout worshippers of San Vincenzo existed in Craco. Those belonging to the confraternity were characterized by wearing a white tunic with a turquoise cape and belt. This group took part in the Mass, processions, and upon request also at funerals.

== Legend ==
The oral history of Craco includes a story of a neighboring town, trying to steal the body of the saint. A legend says that Ferrandinesi tried to steal the body of the saint overnight in 1792. According to the story they took the relic from the church and tried to carry it to their town. As they left Craco, the relic kept getting heavier and heavier until the kidnappers could no longer carry it, and they put it down on the side of the road. When the townspeople from Craco found it, they heard a voice saying, “Take me home and give me music to celebrate my return.” Since then, music and the Inno A San Vincenzo Matire was sung in Craco as a chant.

== San Vincenzo Martire in New York ==
With immigration to North America at the turn of the 20th century, the Crachesi brought the devotion to their patron saint with them. In 1899 they formed a mutual aid society, the Società San Vincenzo Martire di Craco, in New York City.

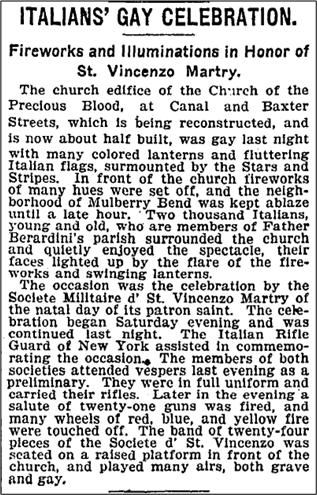
New York Times October 28, 1901, page 7.

One of the founding members of the Società, Pasquale Marrese had a tailor shop in Manhattan and employed several fellow townspeople along with family members. They fashioned a copy of the San Vincenzo relic using a woodcut print image that had been carried from Craco of the saint.

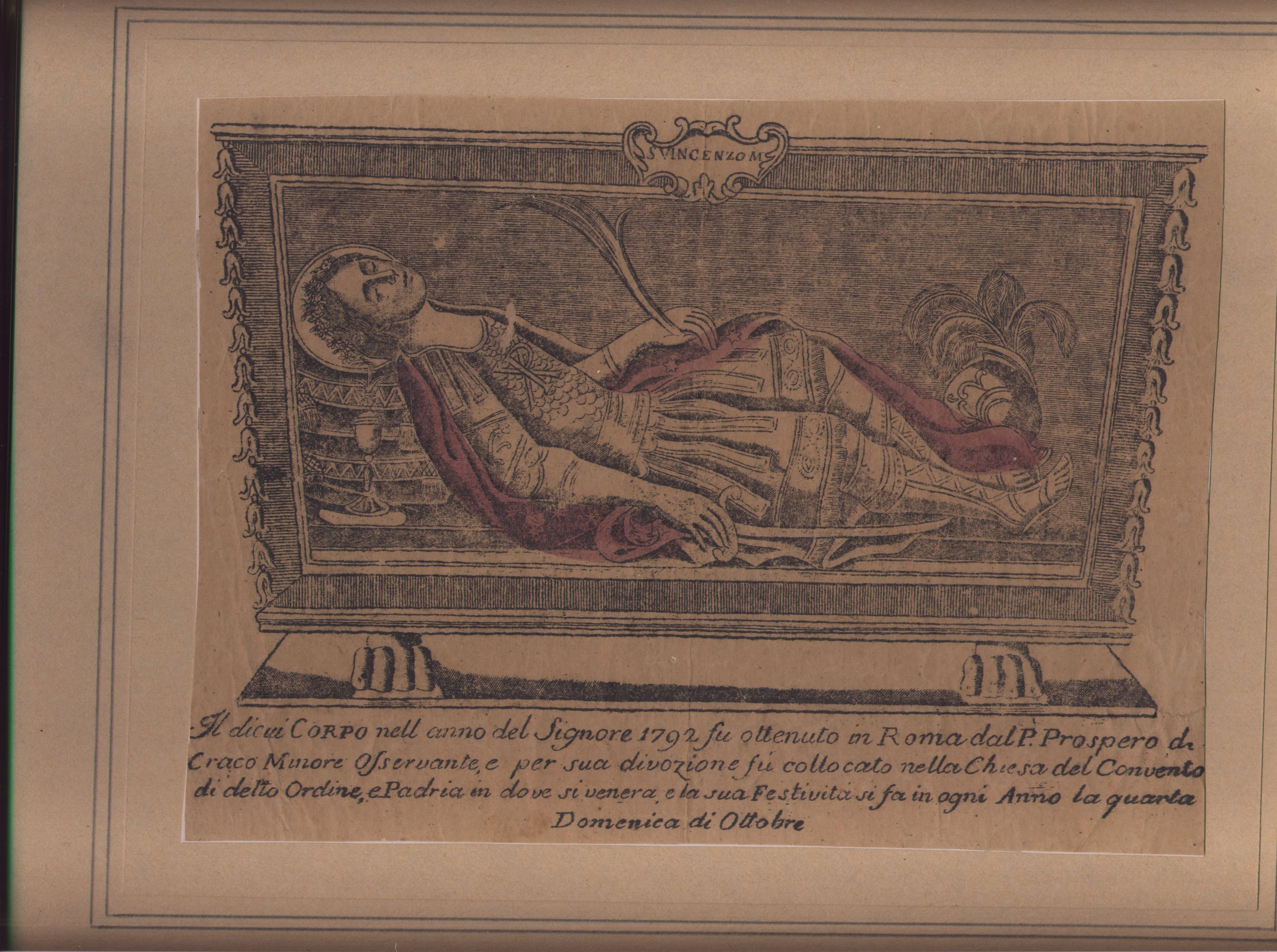
S. Vincenzo Woodcut

Meanwhile, another member of the Società was dispatched to Craco to obtain a copy of the novena so it could be used in America for the feast day celebration. That individual also returned with the bone reliquary from 1769 that had been kept in Craco.

In 1901 this group associated itself with St. Joachim's Church, providing the church with a statue that is a copy of the reclining relic of San Vincenzo in Craco, the 1769 bone relic from Craco, and a handwritten copy of the original novena as said in Craco. The first celebration of the feast of San Vincenzo Martire in New York City's Little Italy was held on Saturday and Sunday October 24–25, 1901. The Societa San Vincenzo Martire di Craco continued to maintain the traditional celebration of the feast on the fourth Sunday of October and was always preceded by a large banquet the evening before. The last celebration sponsored by the Società was in October 1941. With the onset of World War II, the celebration of the feast was suspended although the religious celebration of a special Mass continued. In 1952, the Società San Vincenzo Martire di Craco was dissolved.

Individual devotees, all descendants of the Crachesi immigrants, continued sponsoring the religious celebration of a special Mass for San Vincenzo Martire at St. Joachim's Church. In 1957, an urban renewal project, ordered by the City of New York, dictated the closing of the church in 1958, and required the relocation of the statues before the church was demolished.

The statue, which is a copy of the reclining relic of San Vincenzo in Craco, and the bone relic from 1769 were relocated to the Church of St. Joseph, 5 Monroe Street, Manhattan where arrangements were made for the religious celebration of a special Mass annually. The upright processional statue was placed at St. Rosalia – Regina Pacis Parish in Brooklyn, but was lost to the effects of time.

St. Joseph's Church maintained the annual feast day celebration holding a special Mass on the fourth Sunday in October through 2014. In 2016 the Archdiocese of New York reorganized the parish structure closing St. Joseph's Church on July 31.

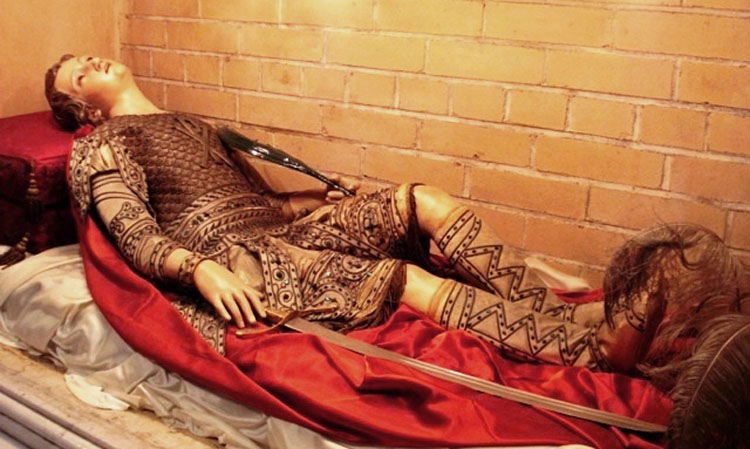
The reclining statue of San Vincenzo in St. Joseph's Church, New York City.

The historic statue of San Vincenzo and relic were relocated to the Shrine Church of the Most Precious Blood, also in Manhattan. It resides there along with several historic Italian American statues of patron saints and the annual feast day continues to be celebrated there.

== Sources ==
- A Brief Sketch of the Life of San Vincenzo Martire, Translated and Adapted by Fr. Regis Gallo, O.F.M.
- Cenni Storici di San Vincenzo Martire e sua Devozione a Craco, Don Leonardo Rocco Rosano and Marco Letagana, I.M.D. Lucania, Pisticci, c. 1980.
- San Vincenzo: un Martire a Craco, Domenica Mormando and Palmina Vignola, a publication of the Associazione Colibri, I.M.D. Lucania, Pisticci, 2005.
- “BREVE STORIA DEL COMUNE DI CRACO e del suo Protettore S. VINCENZO MARTIRE coll’agiunta della NOVENA E RESPONSORIO,” aMsgr. Andrea Mastronardi, 1933.
- "San Vincenzo Martire: And the Crachesi in Two Worlds", The Craco Society, Inc., 2024.
- New York Times, October 28, 1901, Wednesday, Page 7.
- “For the Colours, A Journey Through Italy”, BBC / PBS documentary, Jeffrey Becom, 1990
