= La Roche =

La Roche, LaRoche or Laroche may refer to:

== People ==
- LaRoche (surname), includes Laroche
- Sophie von La Roche, a German writer
- Marquis de La Roche-Helgomarche or Marquis de La Roche-Mesgouez, title held by Troilus de Mesqouez and linked to La Roche-Maurice

== Companies ==
- Laroche Wines, French wine company
- Hoffmann-La Roche, Swiss healthcare company

== Places ==
=== Belgium ===
- La Roche-en-Ardenne, a small town in the Ardennes

=== Canada ===
- La Roche is a township in Quebec

=== France ===
- La Roche-Bernard, in the Morbihan département
- La Roche-Blanche, Puy-de-Dôme, in the Puy-de-Dôme département
- La Roche-Blanche, Loire-Atlantique, in the Loire-Atlantique département
- La Roche-Canillac, in the Corrèze département
- La Roche-Chalais, in the Dordogne département
- La Roche-Clermault, in the Indre-et-Loire département
- La Roche-de-Glun, in the Drôme département
- La Roche-de-Rame, in the Hautes-Alpes département
- La Roche-Derrien, in the Côtes-d'Armor département
- La Roche-des-Arnauds, in the Hautes-Alpes département
- La Roche-en-Brenil, in the Côte-d'Or département
- La Roche-Guyon, in the Val-d'Oise département
- La Roche-l'Abeille, in the Haute-Vienne département
- La Roche-Mabile, in the Orne département
- La Roche, Maré, on Maré Island, New Caledonia
- La Roche-Maurice, in the Finistère département
- La Roche-Morey, in the Haute-Saône département
- La Roche-Noire, in the Puy-de-Dôme département
- La Roche-Posay, in the Vienne département
- La Roche-Rigault, in the Vienne département
- Laroche-Saint-Cydroine, in Yonne dėpartement
- La Roche-sur-Foron, in the Haute-Savoie département
- La Roche-sur-Grane, in the Drôme département
- La Roche-sur-le-Buis, in the Drôme département
- La Roche-sur-Yon, in the Vendée département
- La Roche-Vanneau, in the Côte-d'Or département
- La Roche-Vineuse, in the Saône-et-Loire département
- Baulme-la-Roche, in the Côte-d'Or département
- Beaulieu-sous-la-Roche, in the Vendée département
- Colroy-la-Roche, in the Bas-Rhin département
- Neuviller-la-Roche, in the Bas-Rhin département
- Saint-André-de-la-Roche, in the Alpes-Maritimes département
- Saint-Bazile-de-la-Roche, in the Corrèze département
- Saint-Blaise-la-Roche, in the Bas-Rhin département
- Saint-Cyr-la-Roche, in the Corrèze département
- Saint-Laurent-la-Roche, in the Jura département
- Saint-Paul-la-Roche, in the Dordogne département
- Saint-Pierre-la-Roche, in the Ardèche département
- Saint-Priest-la-Roche, in the Loire département

=== Haiti ===
- La Roche, Grand'Anse, a village in the Moron commune.

=== Switzerland ===
- La Roche, Fribourg
- Roche, Vaud

=== United States ===
- LaRoche College in suburban Pittsburgh
- LaRoche, South Dakota

== Other ==
- La Roche (horse), a Thoroughbred racehorse
- Laroche-Migennes station, serving Laroche-Saint-Cydroine and Migennes, France

== See also ==
- Hoffmann-La Roche
- La Roche-Posay, a cosmetics brand owned by L'Oréal
