= Cruas Nuclear Power Plant =

Nuclear power station in Ardèche, France

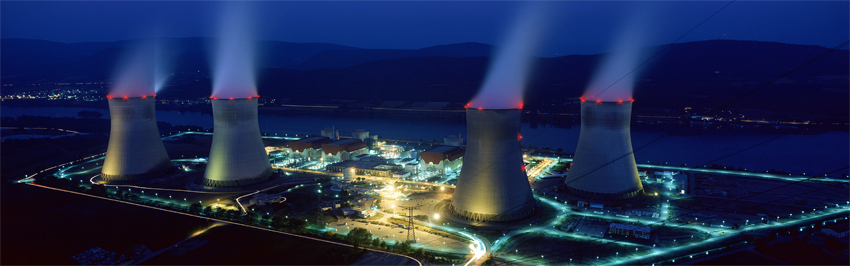
- Cruas Nuclear Power Plant
- Official name: Centrale Nucléaire de Cruas
- Country: France
- Location: Cruas and Meysse, Ardèche
- Coordinates: 44°37′59″N 4°45′24″E
- Status: Operational
- Construction began: 1978
- Commission date: 29 April 1983; 43 years ago
- Operator: EDF

Nuclear power station
- Reactor type: PWR
- Reactor supplier: Framatome

Power generation
- Units operational: 4 x 956 MW
- Make and model: Alstom
- Nameplate capacity: 3824 MW
- Capacity factor: 69.4%
- Annual net output: 23,241 GW·h

External links
- Website: www.edf.com
- Commons: Related media on Commons

The Cruas Nuclear Power Station is a nuclear power plant located in Cruas and Meysse communes, Ardèche next to the Rhône River in France. The site is 35 km north of Tricastin Nuclear Power Center and near the town of Montélimar.

The site contains 4 pressurized water reactors of 900 MW each, totaling 3600 MW total. The construction began in 1978, the reactors were built between 1983 and 1984.

The power station accounts for 4 to 5% of the electric energy production in France, and 40% of the annual usage by the Rhone-Alpes area. The site employs about 1,200 workers and has an area of 148 hectares. Cooling water comes from the Rhône river.

== Incidents ==
On 1 December 2009 reactor 4 was shut down after vegetation blocked the intake of the cooling system. The nuclear safety authority Autorité de sûreté nucléaire (ASN) classified the incident as level 2 on the International Nuclear Event Scale.

A 4.8M earthquake in the Ardeche region on 11 November 2019 meant that Électricité de France was required to halt production and check equipment at the plant. This period offline will mean that EDF will not meet its annual power production projection.

== Mural ==
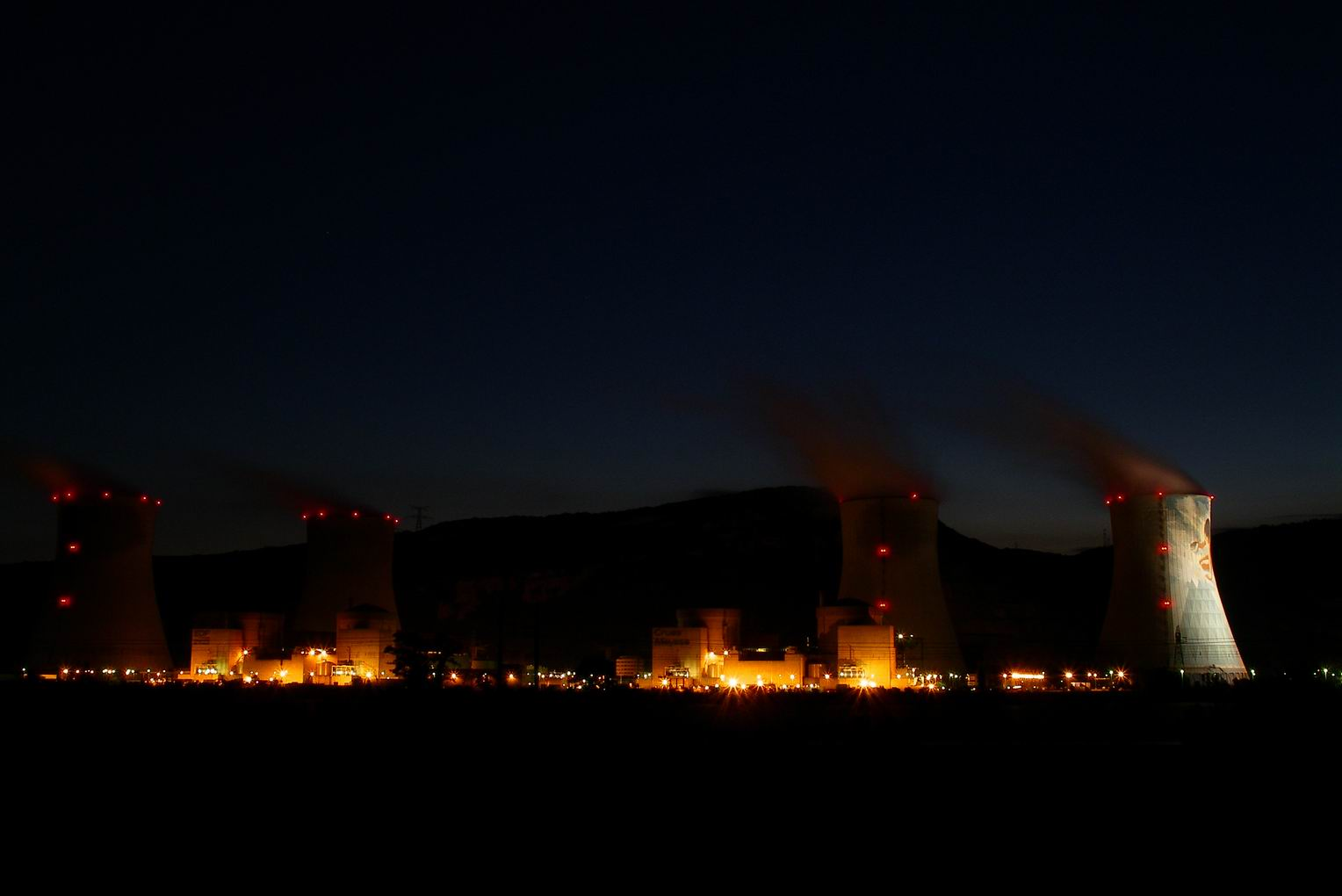
Cooling tower mural on right. Art by Jean-Marie Pierret

In 1991 it was decided by the owners of the plant to carry out a Mural project on the cooling towers focusing on the topic of ecology. Author of the mural on the Tignes Dam, Jean-Marie Pierret was selected to design the painting, 9 mountaineers helped to actually paint the structure. The painting reflects the basics of Water and Air and is titled Aquarius, and was inaugurated in December 1991. It took 8,000 working hours and 4,000 litres (880 imp gal; 1,100 US gal) of paint to complete the project.
