= LaRouche =

LaRouche may refer to:

- Lyndon LaRouche (1922–2019), an American political figure
  - The overall LaRouche movement, an international political and cultural movement
  - The Worldwide LaRouche Youth Movement, which recruits people between the ages of 18 and 25
  - Helga Zepp-LaRouche (born 1948), German political activist and widow of Lyndon LaRouche
- Justin Larouche (born 1995), Canadian handballer
- Pierre Larouche (born 1955), Canadian hockey player
- Steve Larouche (born 1971), Canadian hockey player

== See also ==
- LaRoche (disambiguation)
