= Guieu =

French surname

Guieu is a French surname. Notable people with the surname include:

- Cécile Guieu (born 1963), French marine biogeochemist
- Henri René Guieu (1926–2000), French science fiction writer and ufologist
- Jean Joseph Guieu (1758–1817), French army officer
