= Julie LaRoche =

Canadian marine biologist

- Born: Quebec
- Spouse: Douglas Wallace

Academic background
- Education: B.Sc., McGill University; PhD., Dalhousie University
- Thesis: Adaptation of phytoplankton to fluctuating nitrogen concentrations: long-term and short-term changes in ammonium uptake kinetics (1987)

Julie LaRoche is a Canadian marine biologist. She is a Tier 1 Canada Research Chair in Marine Microbial Genomics and Biogeochemistry at Dalhousie University.

== Early life and education ==
LaRoche was born in Quebec, Canada. She earned her Bachelor of Science from McGill University and her PhD in Biological Oceanography at Dalhousie University. While earning her PhD at Dalhouse, she met her future husband Douglas Wallace.

== Career ==
After completing her postdoctoral studies at Dalhousie University, LaRoche conducted research at the Brookhaven National Laboratory (BNL). While there, LaRoche co-published “Flavodoxin expression as an indicator of iron limitation in marine diatoms" with Helen Murray-Tobin which earned them the Luigi Provasoli Award from the Phycological Society of America for the most outstanding research paper published in the Journal of Phycology. She also studied how stress affects phytoplankton. In 1998, LaRoche accepted a position at the University of Kiel as a professor in their Institute of Oceanography.

LaRoche and her husband stayed in Germany until 2010 when they both accepted placements at their alma mater, Dalhousie. LaRoche was appointed a Tier 1 Canada Research Chair in Marine Microbial Genomics and Biogeochemistry, and her husband was appointed the University's Canada Excellence Research Chair. Upon her return, she developed a lab to research how global climate change is affecting marine microbes and biochemical processes. She specifically studied how phytoplankton and marine bacteria are affected by increases in temperature and decreases in pH. In 2016, she received $149,900 in funding for her plankton research project, which allowed her to purchase a holographic microscope for a commercial ship she uses to study the Deep Panuke drilling station. Previously, her team had only been able to analyze sample of water twice a year until The Atlantic Canadian company voluntarily provided the lab with free access on the Atlantic Condor. The next year, she partnered with Canada C3, a 150-day expedition along the Atlantic, Arctic and Pacific coasts, to collect and share data.

In 2019, LaRoche was renewed as a Canada Research Chair.

To date, LaRoche has published over 170 academic publications, which have been cited over 30,000 times, resulting in an h-index of 70.

== Selected publications ==
- A mesoscale phytoplankton bloom in the polar Southern Ocean stimulated by iron fertilization. Philip W Boyd, Andrew J Watson, Cliff S Law, Edward R Abraham, Thomas Trull, Rob Murdoch, Dorothee CE Bakker, Andrew R Bowie, KO Buesseler, Hoe Chang, Matthew Charette, Peter Croot, Ken Downing, Russell Frew, Mark Gall, Mark Hadfield, Julie Hall, Mike Harvey, Greg Jameson, Julie LaRoche, Malcolm Liddicoat, Roger Ling, Maria T Maldonado, R Michael McKay, Scott Nodder, Stu Pickmere, Rick Pridmore, Steve Rintoul, Karl Safi, Philip Sutton, Robert Strzepek, Kim Tanneberger, Suzanne Turner, Anya Waite, John Zeldis. Nature. 2000.
- Redfield revisited: variability of C [ratio] N [ratio] P in marine microalgae and its biochemical basis. Richard J Geider and Julie La Roche. 2002/2. European Journal of Phycology.
- Global iron connections between desert dust, ocean biogeochemistry, and climate. TD Jickells, ZS An, Katrine K Andersen, AR Baker, G Bergametti, Nick Brooks, JJ Cao, PW Boyd, RA Duce, KA Hunter, H Kawahata, N l Kubilay, J laRoche, PS Liss, N Mahowald, JM Prospero, AJ Ridgwell, I and Tegen, R Torres. Science. 2005.
- Processes and patterns of oceanic nutrient limitation. CM Moore, MM Mills, KR Arrigo, I Berman-Frank, L Bopp, PW Boyd, ED Galbraith, RJ Geider, C Guieu, SL Jaccard, TD Jickells, Julie La Roche, TM Lenton, NM Mahowald, E Marañón, I Marinov, JK Moore, T Nakatsuka, Andreas Oschlies, MA Saito, TF Thingstad, A Tsuda, and O Ulloa. Nature Geoscience. 2013.
- A communal catalogue reveals Earth’s multiscale microbial diversity. Nature. 2017.
