= Saint-Bauzile, Ardèche =

Saint-Bauzile
- Commune
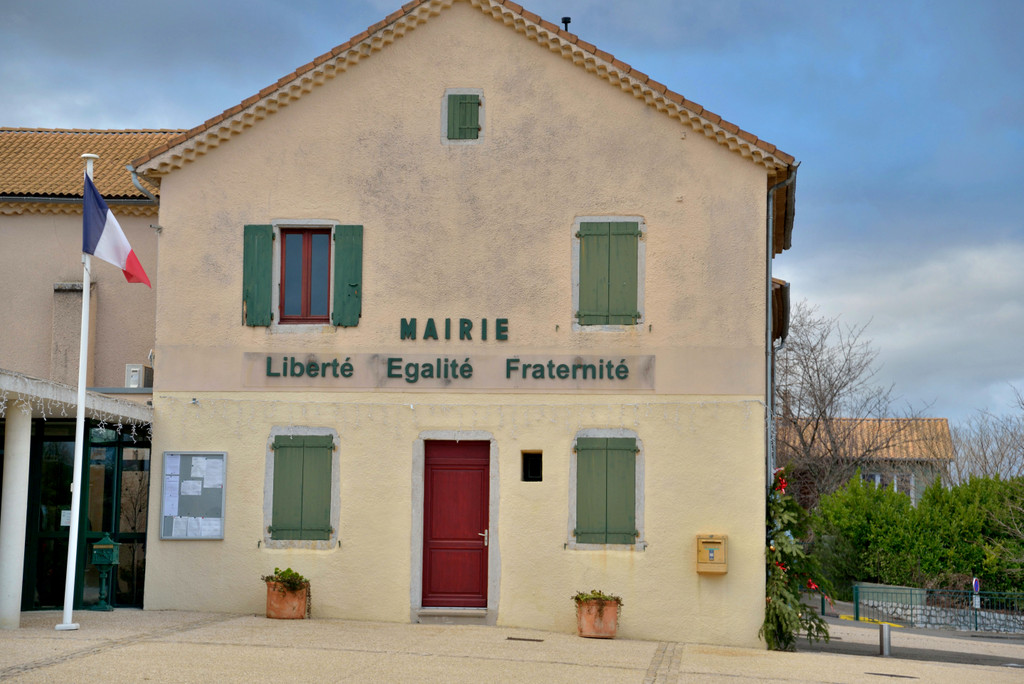
- The town hall in Saint-Bauzile
- Location of Saint-Bauzile
- Location within France Location within Auvergne-Rhône-Alpes
- Coordinates: 44°40′39″N 4°40′29″E
- Country: France
- Region: Auvergne-Rhône-Alpes
- Department: Ardèche
- Arrondissement: Privas
- Canton: Le Pouzin

Government
  - Mayor (2020–2026): Michel Heyraud
- Area^{1}: 7.05 km^{2} (2.72 sq mi)
- Elevation: 314 m (1,030 ft)
- Highest elevation: 646 m (2,119 ft)
- Lowest elevation: 220 m (720 ft)
- Population (2023): 311
  - Density: 44.1/km^{2} (114/sq mi)
- Time zone: UTC+01:00 (CET)
  - Summer (DST): UTC+02:00 (CEST)
- INSEE/Postal code: 07219 /07210
- ^{1} French Land Register data, which excludes lakes, ponds, glaciers > 1 km^{2} (0.386 sq mi or 247 acres) and river estuaries.

Saint-Bauzile (French pronunciation: [sɛ̃ bozil]; Occitan: Sent Bausèli) is a commune in the Ardèche department in southern France.

== Population ==
Historical population
| Year | Pop. | ±% p.a. |
|---|---|---|
| 1968 | 135 | — |
| 1975 | 105 | −3.53% |
| 1982 | 124 | +2.40% |
| 1990 | 153 | +2.66% |
| 1999 | 183 | +2.01% |
| 2007 | 263 | +4.64% |
| 2012 | 283 | +1.48% |
| 2017 | 308 | +1.71% |
| 2023 | 311 | +0.16% |
Source: INSEE

== See also ==
- Communes of the Ardèche department

== Kathleen Cavendish (Kennedy) Death ==
Kathleen Cavendish, Marchioness of Hartington (née Kennedy; February 20, 1920 – May 13, 1948), also known as "Kick" Kennedy, was an American socialite and sister to John Fitzgerald Kennedy. She died in a plane crash in 1948, flying to the south of France while on vacation with her new partner, the 8th Earl Fitzwilliam.
