= Rochemaure =

- Commune
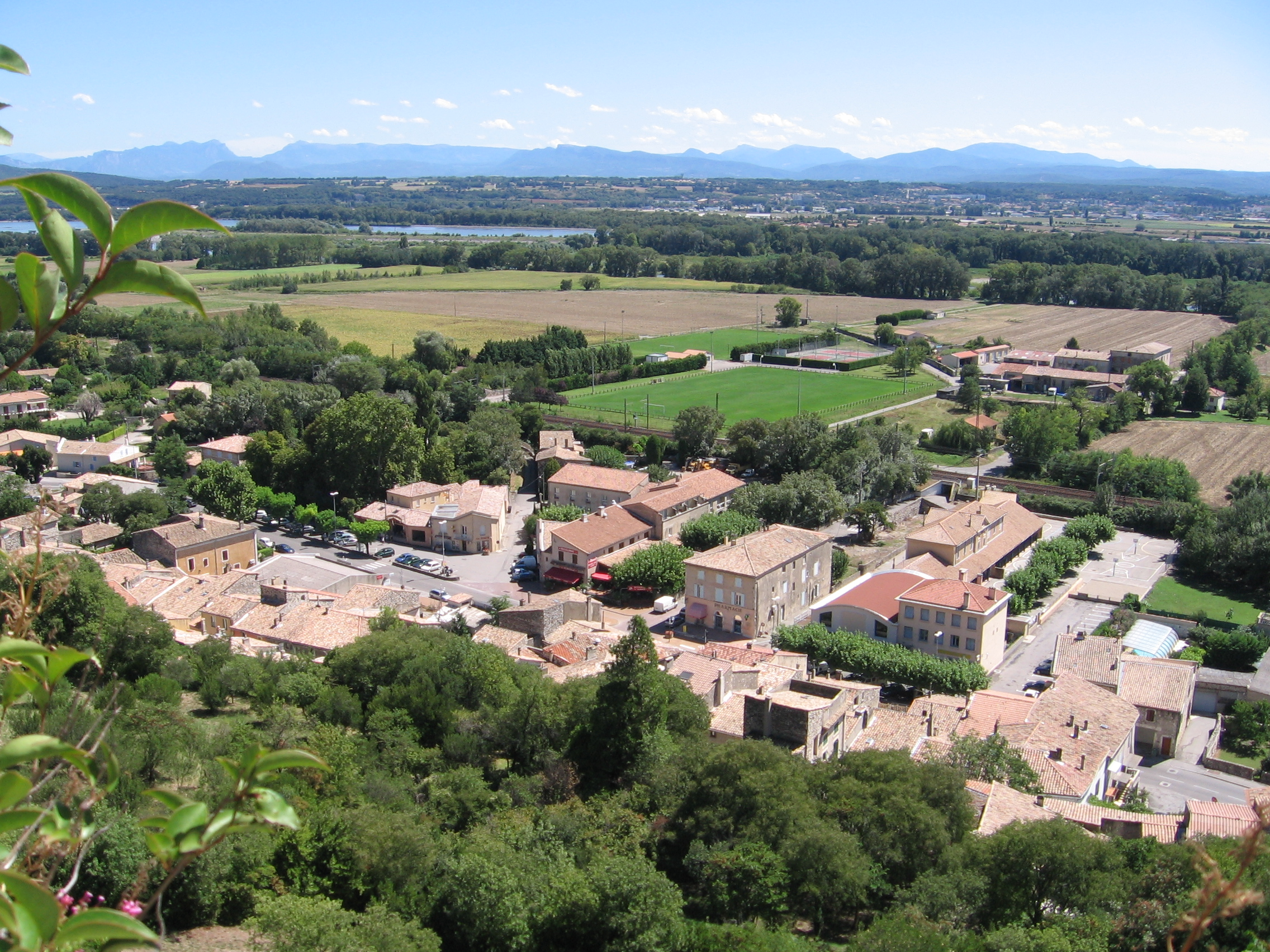
- A general view of Rochemaure

- Coat of arms
- Location of Rochemaure
- Location within France Location within Auvergne-Rhône-Alpes
- Coordinates: 44°35′18″N 4°42′14″E
- Country: France
- Region: Auvergne-Rhône-Alpes
- Department: Ardèche
- Arrondissement: Privas
- Canton: Le Pouzin

Government
  - Mayor (2020–2026): Olivier Faure
- Area^{1}: 24.33 km^{2} (9.39 sq mi)
- Elevation: 76 m (249 ft)
- Highest elevation: 682 m (2,238 ft)
- Lowest elevation: 55 m (180 ft)
- Population (2023): 2,239
  - Density: 92.03/km^{2} (238.3/sq mi)
- Time zone: UTC+01:00 (CET)
  - Summer (DST): UTC+02:00 (CEST)
- INSEE/Postal code: 07191 /07400
- ^{1} French Land Register data, which excludes lakes, ponds, glaciers > 1 km^{2} (0.386 sq mi or 247 acres) and river estuaries.

Rochemaure (French pronunciation: [ʁɔʃmoʁ]; Occitan: Ròchamaura) is a commune in the Ardèche department in Southern France. Many inhabitants of Rochemaure are in favour of the proposed road deviation in order to preserve the historic and cultural nature of the village. It is classified as a "village of character"; however, the area currently has a major departmental road running through it. The deviation would improve safety for cyclists of the Viarhonna as well as children who attend the local schools.

== Population ==
Historical population
Year	Pop.	±% p.a.
1968	970	—
1975	1,067	+1.37%
1982	1,789	+7.66%
1990	1,809	+0.14%
1999	1,870	+0.37%
2007	1,978	+0.70%
2012	2,286	+2.94%
2017	2,281	−0.04%
2023	2,239	−0.31%
Source: INSEE

== See also ==
- Communes of the Ardèche department
