= Saint-Vincent-de-Barrès =

- Commune
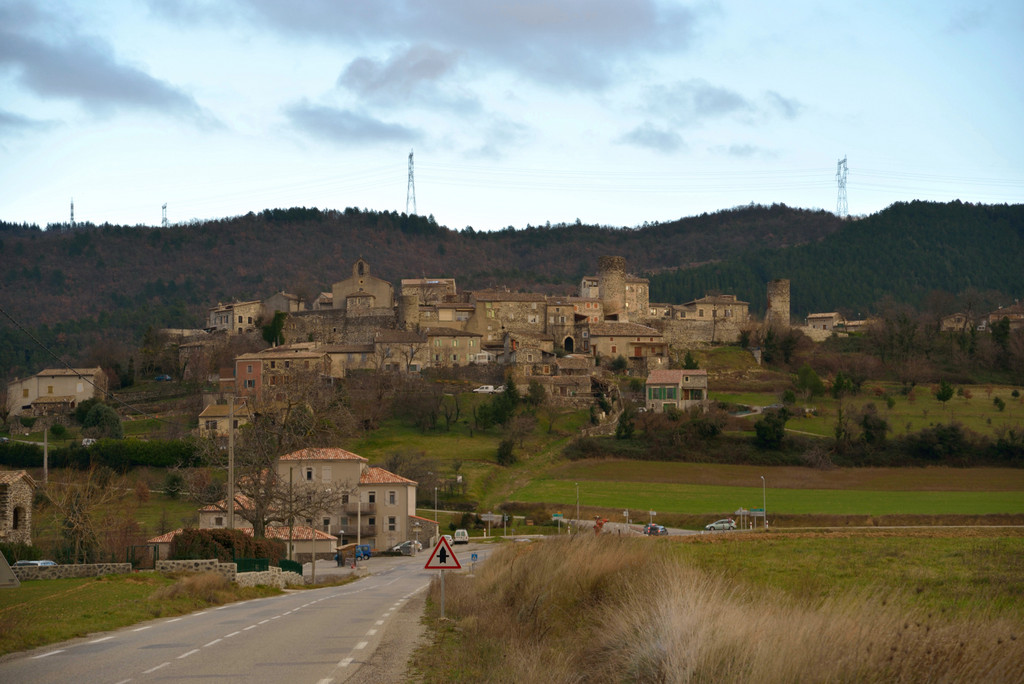
- A general view of Saint-Vincent-de-Barrès
- Location of Saint-Vincent-de-Barrès
- Location within France Location within Auvergne-Rhône-Alpes
- Coordinates: 44°39′42″N 4°42′34″E
- Country: France
- Region: Auvergne-Rhône-Alpes
- Department: Ardèche
- Arrondissement: Privas
- Canton: Le Pouzin

Government
  - Mayor (2020–2026): Paul Savatier
- Area^{1}: 19.1 km^{2} (7.4 sq mi)
- Elevation: 400 m (1,300 ft)
- Highest elevation: 560 m (1,840 ft)
- Lowest elevation: 153 m (502 ft)
- Population (2023): 824
  - Density: 43.1/km^{2} (112/sq mi)
- Time zone: UTC+01:00 (CET)
  - Summer (DST): UTC+02:00 (CEST)
- INSEE/Postal code: 07302 /07210
- ^{1} French Land Register data, which excludes lakes, ponds, glaciers > 1 km^{2} (0.386 sq mi or 247 acres) and river estuaries.

Saint-Vincent-de-Barrès (French pronunciation: [sɛ̃ vɛ̃sɑ̃ də baʁɛs]; Vivaro-Alpine: Sant Vincent de Barrès) is a commune in the Ardèche department in southern France.

== Population ==
Historical population
Year	Pop.	±% p.a.
1968	360	—
1975	314	−1.93%
1982	330	+0.71%
1990	524	+5.95%
1999	605	+1.61%
2007	770	+3.06%
2012	826	+1.41%
2017	837	+0.26%
2023	824	−0.26%
Source: INSEE

== See also ==
- Communes of the Ardèche department
