= La Chailleuse =

Commune in Bourgogne-Franche-Comté, France

- Commune
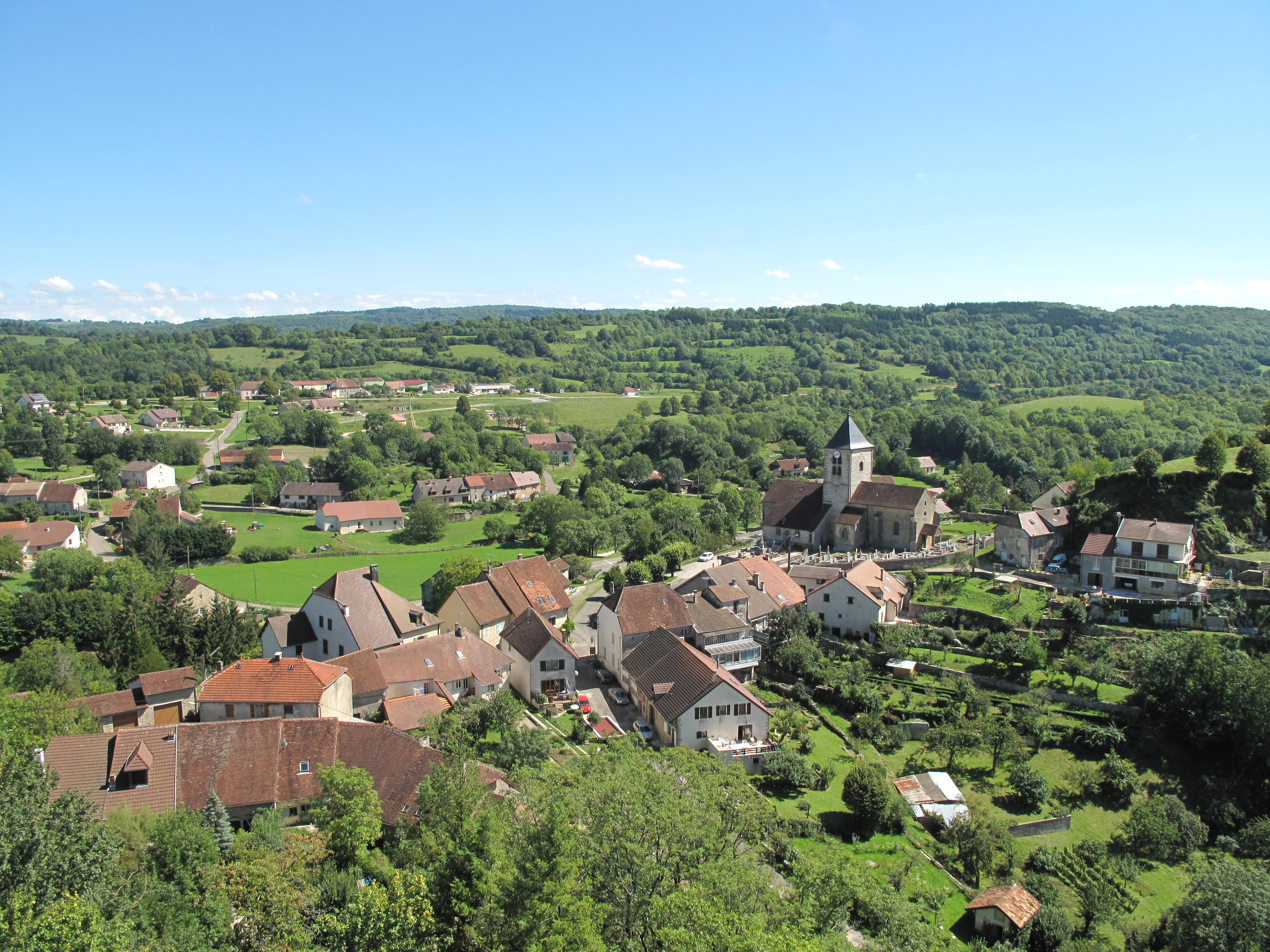
- A general view of Saint-Laurent-la-Roche
- Location of La Chailleuse
- Location within France Location within Bourgogne-Franche-Comté
- Coordinates: 46°35′10″N 5°31′48″E
- Country: France
- Region: Bourgogne-Franche-Comté
- Department: Jura
- Arrondissement: Lons-le-Saunier
- Canton: Saint-Amour
- Intercommunality: Terre d'Émeraude Communauté

Government
  - Mayor (2020–2026): Pierre-Rémy Belperron
- Area^{1}: 24.53 km^{2} (9.47 sq mi)
- Population (2023): 587
  - Density: 23.9/km^{2} (62.0/sq mi)
- Time zone: UTC+01:00 (CET)
  - Summer (DST): UTC+02:00 (CEST)
- INSEE/Postal code: 39021 /39270, 39570
- ^{1} French Land Register data, which excludes lakes, ponds, glaciers > 1 km^{2} (0.386 sq mi or 247 acres) and river estuaries.

La Chailleuse (French pronunciation: [la ʃajøz]) is a commune in the Jura department of eastern France. The municipality was established on 1 January 2016 and consists of the former communes of Arthenas, Essia, Saint-Laurent-la-Roche and Varessia.

== See also ==
- Communes of the Jura department
