= Saint-Martin-sur-Lavezon =

- Commune
- Location of Saint-Martin-sur-Lavezon
- Location within France Location within Auvergne-Rhône-Alpes
- Coordinates: 44°38′17″N 4°39′07″E
- Country: France
- Region: Auvergne-Rhône-Alpes
- Department: Ardèche
- Arrondissement: Privas
- Canton: Le Pouzin

Government
  - Mayor (2020–2026): Marie-Noëlle Laville
- Area^{1}: 23.54 km^{2} (9.09 sq mi)
- Elevation: 228 m (748 ft)
- Highest elevation: 702 m (2,303 ft)
- Lowest elevation: 119 m (390 ft)
- Population (2023): 422
  - Density: 17.9/km^{2} (46.4/sq mi)
- Time zone: UTC+01:00 (CET)
  - Summer (DST): UTC+02:00 (CEST)
- INSEE/Postal code: 07270 /07400
- ^{1} French Land Register data, which excludes lakes, ponds, glaciers > 1 km^{2} (0.386 sq mi or 247 acres) and river estuaries.

Saint-Martin-sur-Lavezon (French pronunciation: [sɛ̃ maʁtɛ̃ syʁ lavezɔ̃]) is a commune in the Ardèche department in southern France.

== Population ==
Historical population
Year	Pop.	±% p.a.
1968	278	—
1975	232	−2.55%
1982	321	+4.75%
1990	351	+1.12%
1999	395	+1.32%
2007	435	+1.21%
2012	441	+0.27%
2017	432	−0.41%
2023	422	−0.39%
Source: INSEE

== See also ==
- Communes of the Ardèche department
