= Arthenas =

- Part of La Chailleuse
- Location of Arthenas
- Location within France Location within Bourgogne-Franche-Comté
- Coordinates: 46°35′12″N 5°31′51″E
- Country: France
- Region: Bourgogne-Franche-Comté
- Department: Jura
- Arrondissement: Lons-le-Saunier
- Canton: Moirans-en-Montagne
- Commune: La Chailleuse
- Area^{1}: 6.71 km^{2} (2.59 sq mi)
- Highest elevation: 603 m (1,978 ft)
- Lowest elevation: 464 m (1,522 ft)
- Population (2013): 159
  - Density: 23.7/km^{2} (61.4/sq mi)
- Time zone: UTC+01:00 (CET)
  - Summer (DST): UTC+02:00 (CEST)
- Postal code: 39270
- ^{1} French Land Register data, which excludes lakes, ponds, glaciers > 1 km^{2} (0.386 sq mi or 247 acres) and river estuaries.

Arthenas (French pronunciation: [aʁtəna]) is a former commune in the Jura department in the region of Bourgogne-Franche-Comté in eastern France. On 1 January 2016, it was merged into the new commune of La Chailleuse.

== See also ==
- Communes of the Jura department
