= Canton of Le Pouzin =

Coordinates: 44.76°N 4.75°E

- Canton
- Situation of the canton of Le Pouzin in the department of Ardèche
- Country: France
- Region: Auvergne-Rhône-Alpes
- Department: Ardèche
- No. of communes: {{{nbcomm}}}
- Population (2023): 16,771
- INSEE code: 0709

The canton of Le Pouzin is an administrative division of the Ardèche department, southern France. It was created at the French canton reorganisation which came into effect in March 2015. Its seat is in Le Pouzin.

It consists of the following communes:

1. Baix
2. Cruas
3. Meysse
4. Le Pouzin
5. Rochemaure
6. Rompon
7. Saint-Bauzile
8. Saint-Julien-en-Saint-Alban
9. Saint-Lager-Bressac
10. Saint-Martin-sur-Lavezon
11. Saint-Pierre-la-Roche
12. Saint-Symphorien-sous-Chomérac
13. Saint-Vincent-de-Barrès
