= Varessia =

- Part of La Chailleuse
- Location of Varessia
- Location within France Location within Bourgogne-Franche-Comté
- Coordinates: 46°33′37″N 5°32′27″E
- Country: France
- Region: Bourgogne-Franche-Comté
- Department: Jura
- Arrondissement: Lons-le-Saunier
- Canton: Moirans-en-Montagne
- Commune: La Chailleuse
- Area^{1}: 1.83 km^{2} (0.71 sq mi)
- Highest elevation: 672 m (2,205 ft)
- Lowest elevation: 473 m (1,552 ft)
- Population (2018): 33
  - Density: 18/km^{2} (47/sq mi)
- Time zone: UTC+01:00 (CET)
  - Summer (DST): UTC+02:00 (CEST)
- Postal code: 39270
- ^{1} French Land Register data, which excludes lakes, ponds, glaciers > 1 km^{2} (0.386 sq mi or 247 acres) and river estuaries.

Varessia (French pronunciation: [vaʁesja]) is a former commune in the Jura department in the Bourgogne-Franche-Comté region in eastern France. On 1 January 2016, it was merged into the new commune of La Chailleuse. Its population was 33 in 2018. The population in 2022 was 590.

== See also ==
- Communes of the Jura department
