= Saint-Lager-Bressac =

- Commune
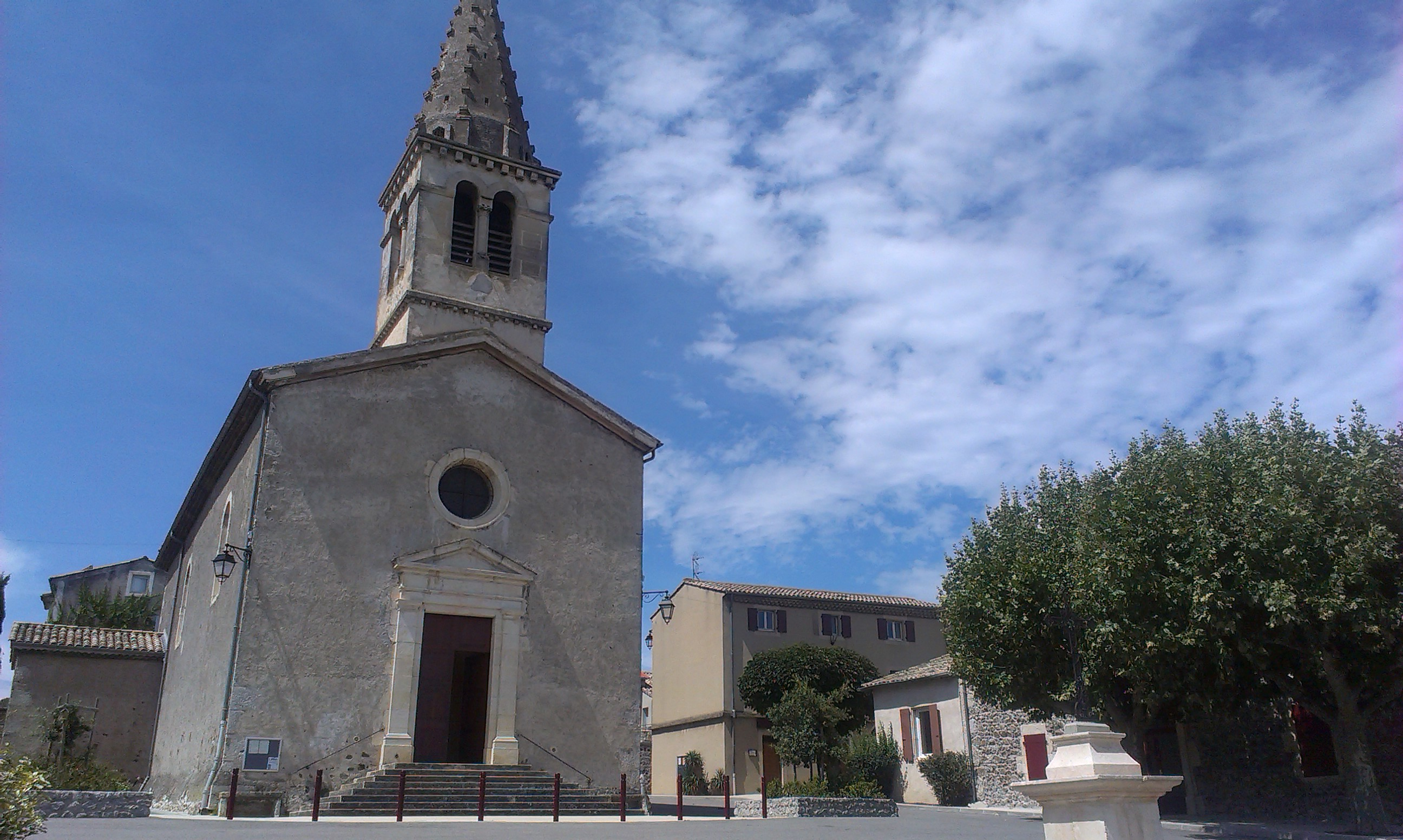
- The church in Saint-Lager-Bressac

- Coat of arms
- Location of Saint-Lager-Bressac
- Location within France Location within Auvergne-Rhône-Alpes
- Coordinates: 44°41′36″N 4°42′41″E
- Country: France
- Region: Auvergne-Rhône-Alpes
- Department: Ardèche
- Arrondissement: Privas
- Canton: Le Pouzin

Government
  - Mayor (2020–2026): Alain Bernards
- Area^{1}: 15.37 km^{2} (5.93 sq mi)
- Elevation: 158 m (518 ft)
- Highest elevation: 553 m (1,814 ft)
- Lowest elevation: 130 m (430 ft)
- Population (2023): 971
  - Density: 63.2/km^{2} (164/sq mi)
- Time zone: UTC+01:00 (CET)
  - Summer (DST): UTC+02:00 (CEST)
- INSEE/Postal code: 07260 /07210
- ^{1} French Land Register data, which excludes lakes, ponds, glaciers > 1 km^{2} (0.386 sq mi or 247 acres) and river estuaries.

Saint-Lager-Bressac (French pronunciation: [sɛ̃ laʒe bʁɛsak]; Occitan: Sant Lager Bressac) is a commune in the Ardèche department in southern France.

== Population ==
Historical population
Year	Pop.	±% p.a.
1968	373	—
1975	382	+0.34%
1982	491	+3.65%
1990	569	+1.86%
1999	663	+1.71%
2007	850	+3.15%
2012	888	+0.88%
2017	922	+0.75%
2023	971	+0.87%
Source: INSEE

== See also ==
- Communes of the Ardèche department
