= Cruas =

- Commune
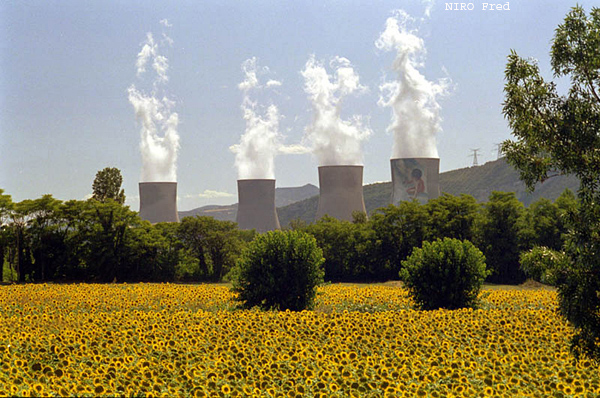
- Cruas Nuclear Power Plant
- Location of Cruas
- Location within France Location within Auvergne-Rhône-Alpes
- Coordinates: 44°39′28″N 4°45′49″E
- Country: France
- Region: Auvergne-Rhône-Alpes
- Department: Ardèche
- Arrondissement: Privas
- Canton: Le Pouzin

Government
  - Mayor (2020–2026): Rachel Cotta
- Area^{1}: 15.45 km^{2} (5.97 sq mi)
- Highest elevation: 480 m (1,570 ft)
- Lowest elevation: 72 m (236 ft)
- Population (2023): 2,898
  - Density: 187.6/km^{2} (485.8/sq mi)
- Time zone: UTC+01:00 (CET)
  - Summer (DST): UTC+02:00 (CEST)
- INSEE/Postal code: 07076 /07350
- ^{1} French Land Register data, which excludes lakes, ponds, glaciers > 1 km^{2} (0.386 sq mi or 247 acres) and river estuaries.

Cruas (French pronunciation: [kʁyas]; Occitan: Cruàs) is a commune near the river Rhône in the Ardèche department in southern France.

The village has a Romanesque abbey with a crypt.

== Population ==
Historical population
Year	Pop.	±% p.a.
1968	1,978	—
1975	1,638	−2.66%
1982	2,370	+5.42%
1990	2,200	−0.93%
1999	2,400	+0.97%
2007	2,670	+1.34%
2012	2,872	+1.47%
2017	3,008	+0.93%
2023	2,898	−0.62%
Source: INSEE

== Sights and monuments ==
Cruas has two notable monuments historiques

- Abbatiale Sainte-Marie: church dating from the 11th and 12th centuries, listed since 1862 as a monument historique by the French Ministry of Culture.
- Château des Moines and its old village, a ruined 12 century to 15th century castle, listed since 1912.

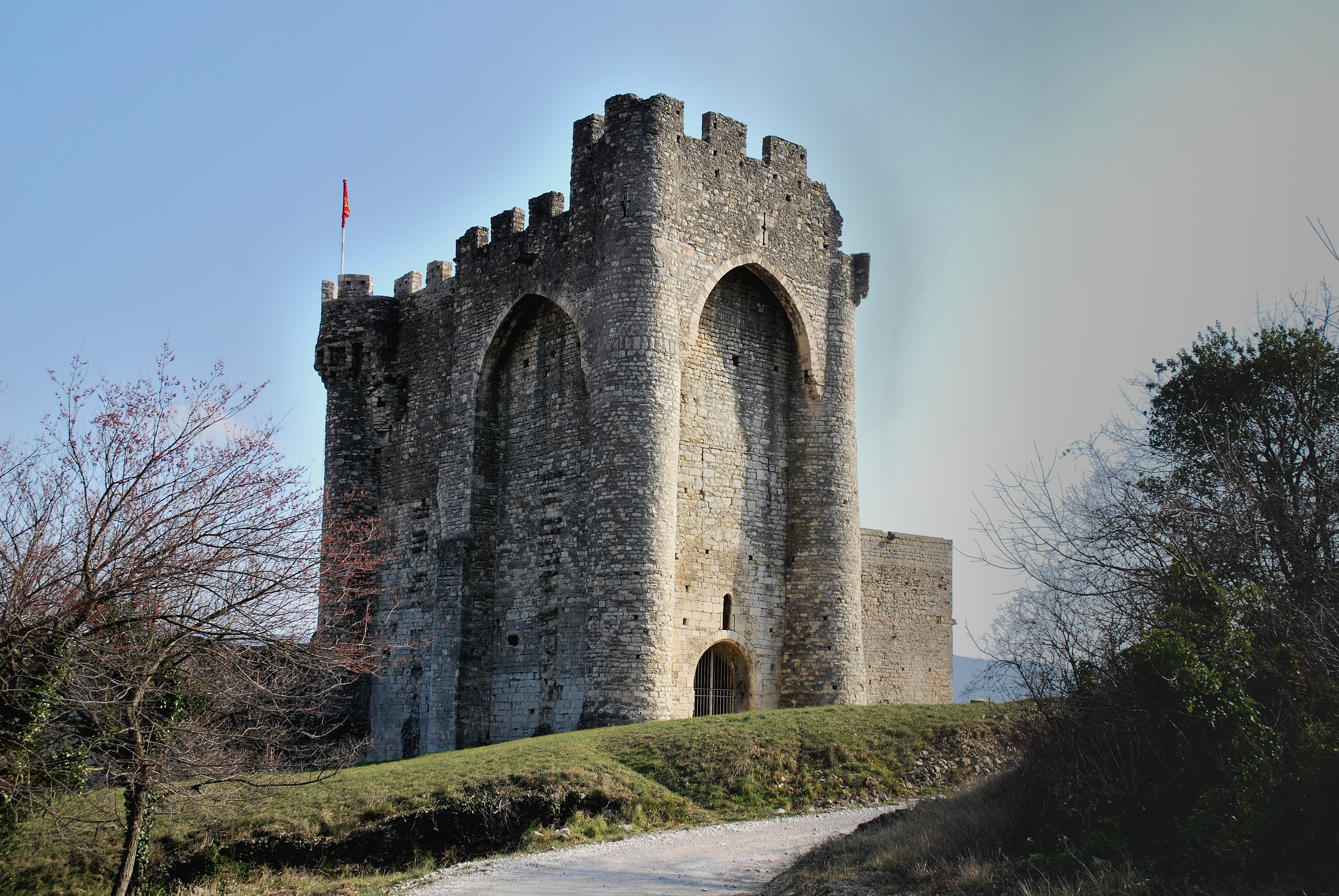
Château des Moines

== See also ==
- Communes of the Ardèche department
