= Le Pouzin =

- Commune
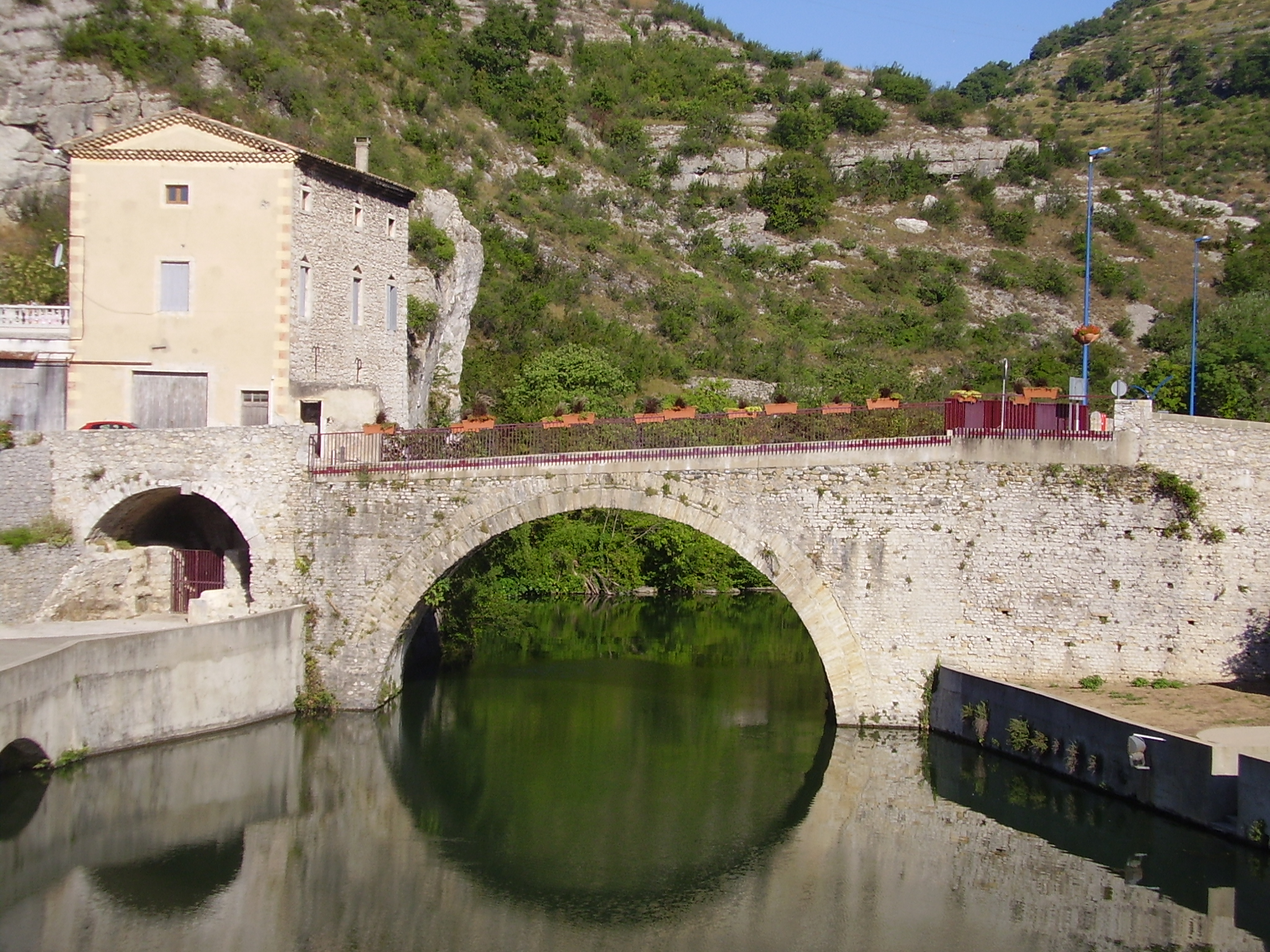
- Roman bridge

- Coat of arms
- Location of Le Pouzin
- Location within France Location within Auvergne-Rhône-Alpes
- Coordinates: 44°45′15″N 4°44′55″E
- Country: France
- Region: Auvergne-Rhône-Alpes
- Department: Ardèche
- Arrondissement: Privas
- Canton: Le Pouzin
- Intercommunality: CA Privas Centre Ardèche

Government
  - Mayor (2020–2026): Christophe Vignal
- Area^{1}: 12.52 km^{2} (4.83 sq mi)
- Elevation: 95 m (312 ft)
- Highest elevation: 385 m (1,263 ft)
- Lowest elevation: 82 m (269 ft)
- Population (2023): 2,886
  - Density: 230.5/km^{2} (597.0/sq mi)
- Time zone: UTC+01:00 (CET)
  - Summer (DST): UTC+02:00 (CEST)
- INSEE/Postal code: 07181 /07250
- ^{1} French Land Register data, which excludes lakes, ponds, glaciers > 1 km^{2} (0.386 sq mi or 247 acres) and river estuaries.

Le Pouzin (French pronunciation: [lə puzɛ̃]; Occitan: Lo Polzin) is a commune in the Ardèche department in southern France.

== Population ==
Historical population
Year	Pop.	±% p.a.
1968	2,555	—
1975	2,628	+0.40%
1982	2,720	+0.49%
1990	2,693	−0.12%
1999	2,704	+0.05%
2007	2,820	+0.53%
2012	2,785	−0.25%
2017	2,879	+0.67%
2023	2,886	+0.04%
Source: INSEE

== See also ==
- Communes of the Ardèche department
