= Saint-Julien-en-Saint-Alban =

Commune in Auvergne-Rhône-Alpes, France

- Commune
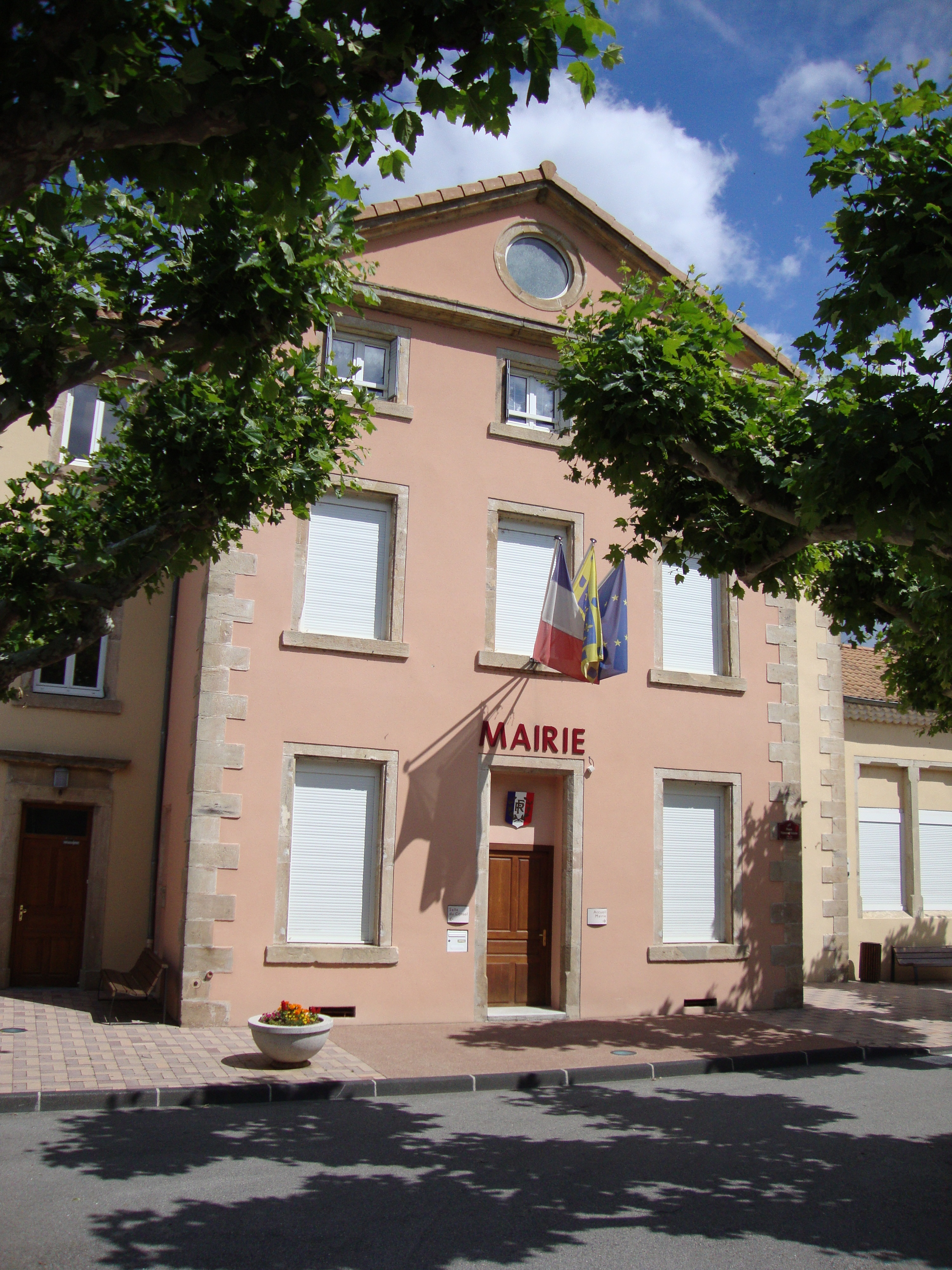
- The town hall in Saint-Julien-en-Saint-Alban
- Location of Saint-Julien-en-Saint-Alban
- Location within France Location within Auvergne-Rhône-Alpes
- Coordinates: 44°45′19″N 4°41′53″E
- Country: France
- Region: Auvergne-Rhône-Alpes
- Department: Ardèche
- Arrondissement: Privas
- Canton: Le Pouzin
- Intercommunality: CA Privas Centre Ardèche

Government
  - Mayor (2020–2026): Julien Fougeirol
- Area^{1}: 10.39 km^{2} (4.01 sq mi)
- Elevation: 131 m (430 ft)
- Highest elevation: 697 m (2,287 ft)
- Lowest elevation: 98 m (322 ft)
- Population (2023): 1,465
  - Density: 141.0/km^{2} (365.2/sq mi)
- Time zone: UTC+01:00 (CET)
  - Summer (DST): UTC+02:00 (CEST)
- INSEE/Postal code: 07255 /07000
- ^{1} French Land Register data, which excludes lakes, ponds, glaciers > 1 km^{2} (0.386 sq mi or 247 acres) and river estuaries.

Saint-Julien-en-Saint-Alban (French pronunciation: [sɛ̃ ʒyljɛ̃ ɑ̃ sɛ̃.t‿albɑ̃]; Vivaro-Alpine: Sant Julien en Sant Alban) is a commune in the Ardèche department in southern France.

== Population ==
Historical population
Year	Pop.	±% p.a.
1968	763	—
1975	815	+0.95%
1982	903	+1.48%
1990	924	+0.29%
1999	1,022	+1.13%
2007	1,246	+2.51%
2012	1,364	+1.83%
2017	1,514	+2.11%
2023	1,465	−0.55%
Source: INSEE

== See also ==
- Communes of the Ardèche department
