= LaRoche (surname) =

LaRoche or Laroche is a surname. Notable people with the surname include:

- Adam LaRoche, baseball first baseman, son of Dave, and brother of Andy
- Andy LaRoche, baseball third baseman, son of Dave, and brother of Adam
- Dave LaRoche, baseball pitcher, father of Adam and Andy LaRoche
- Emmanuel Laroche, linguist
- François Laroche, French general
- Gérald Laroche, French actor
- Guy Laroche, fashion designer
- James La Roche, British member of Parliament for Bodmin from 1768 to 1780
- Jean-Edmond Laroche-Joubert (1820–84), French industrialist and politician
- John LaRoche (c.1700–52), British Member of Parliament for Bodmin from 1727 to 1747
- Louise Laroche, Titanic survivor
- Nicholas LaRoche, figure skater
- Nicole Laroche (née Schrottenloher) (1945-2019), French engineer, 1964 the first female Gadzarts at École nationale supérieure d'arts et métiers.
- Phoenix Laroche (born 2012/2013), English actor
- Raymonde de Laroche, early female pilot
- John Laroche (b.1962), American horticulturalist
- Julie LaRoche (b. 1957), Canadian marine biologist
- Joseph Philippe Lemercier Laroche Titanic Passenger
