= Essia =

- Part of La Chailleuse
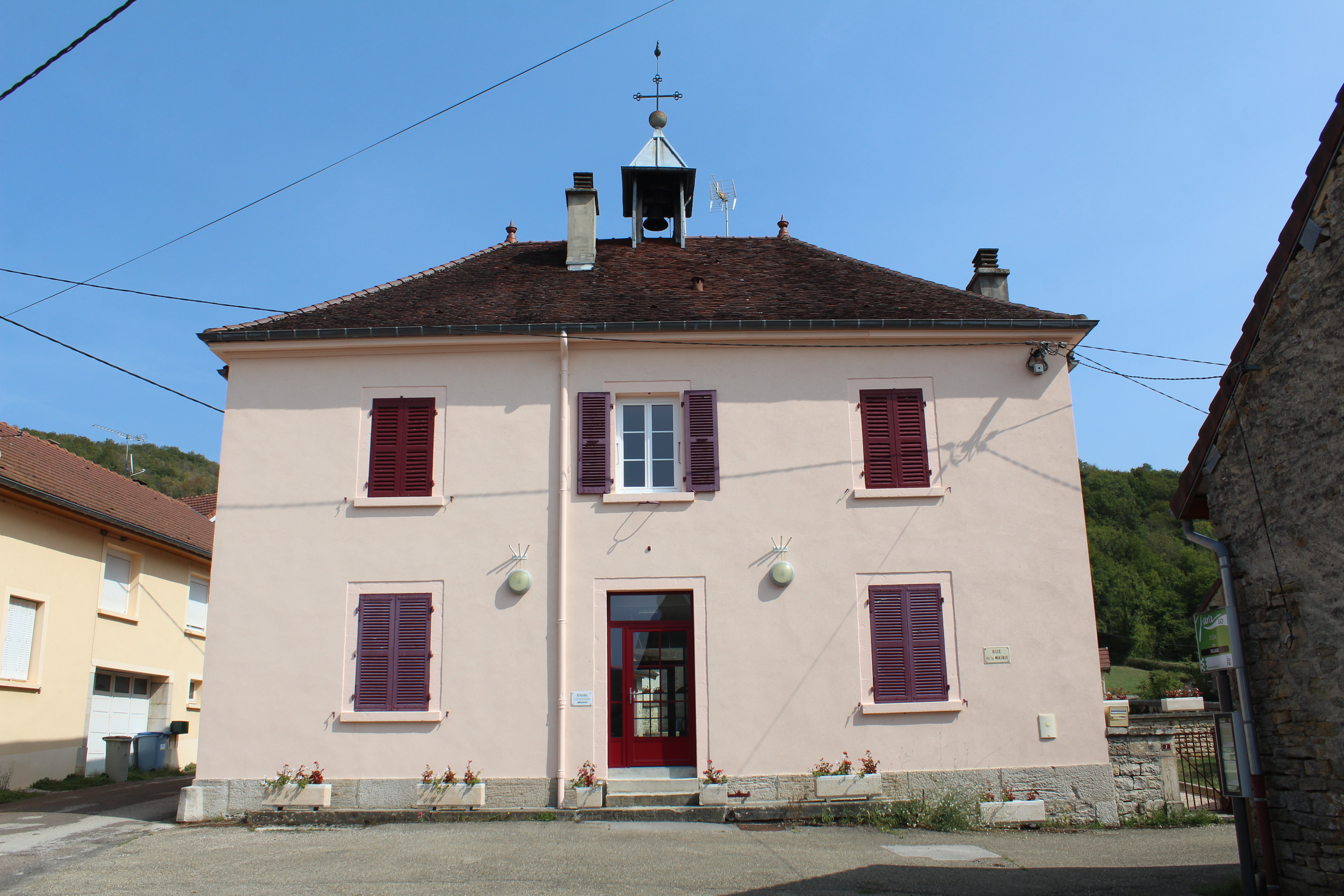
- Town hall
- Location of Essia
- Location within France Location within Bourgogne-Franche-Comté
- Coordinates: 46°35′11″N 5°32′57″E
- Country: France
- Region: Bourgogne-Franche-Comté
- Department: Jura
- Arrondissement: Lons-le-Saunier
- Canton: Moirans-en-Montagne
- Commune: La Chailleuse
- Area^{1}: 4.86 km^{2} (1.88 sq mi)
- Highest elevation: 640 m (2,100 ft)
- Lowest elevation: 459 m (1,506 ft)
- Population (2018): 72
  - Density: 15/km^{2} (38/sq mi)
- Time zone: UTC+01:00 (CET)
  - Summer (DST): UTC+02:00 (CEST)
- Postal code: 39270
- ^{1} French Land Register data, which excludes lakes, ponds, glaciers > 1 km^{2} (0.386 sq mi or 247 acres) and river estuaries.

Essia (French pronunciation: [esja]) is a former commune in the Jura department in Bourgogne-Franche-Comté in eastern France. On 1 January 2016, it was merged into the new commune of La Chailleuse.

== See also ==
- Communes of the Jura department
