= Saint-Laurent-la-Roche =

- Part of La Chailleuse
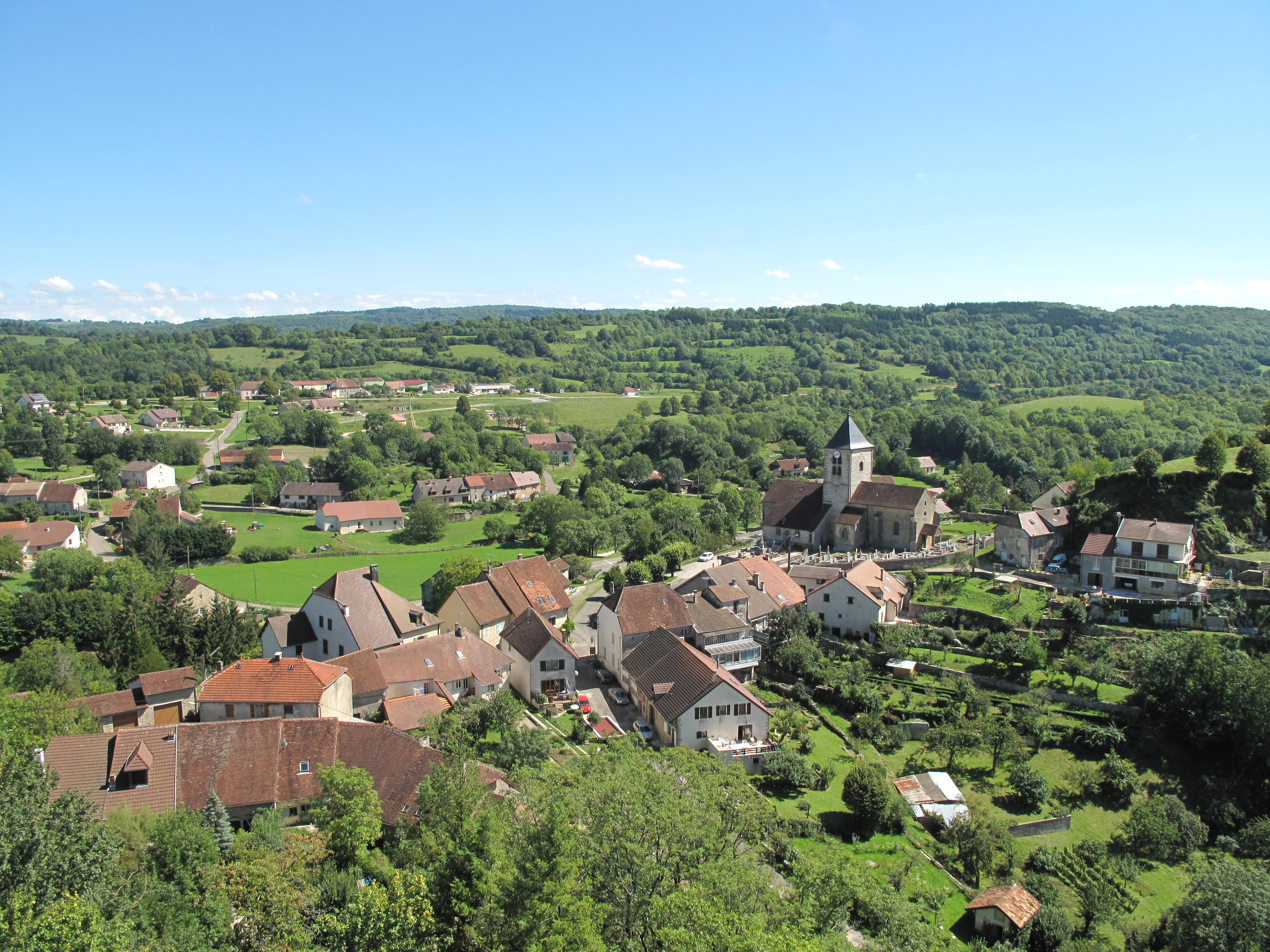

- Coat of arms
- Location of Saint-Laurent-la-Roche
- Location within France Location within Bourgogne-Franche-Comté
- Coordinates: 46°36′03″N 5°31′39″E
- Country: France
- Region: Bourgogne-Franche-Comté
- Department: Jura
- Arrondissement: Lons-le-Saunier
- Canton: Saint-Amour
- Commune: La Chailleuse
- Area^{1}: 11.13 km^{2} (4.30 sq mi)
- Highest elevation: 578 m (1,896 ft)
- Lowest elevation: 270 m (890 ft)
- Population (2018): 328
  - Density: 29.5/km^{2} (76.3/sq mi)
- Time zone: UTC+01:00 (CET)
  - Summer (DST): UTC+02:00 (CEST)
- Postal code: 39570
- ^{1} French Land Register data, which excludes lakes, ponds, glaciers > 1 km^{2} (0.386 sq mi or 247 acres) and river estuaries.

Saint-Laurent-la-Roche (French pronunciation: [sɛ̃ loʁɑ̃ la ʁɔʃ]) is a former commune in the Jura department in the Bourgogne-Franche-Comté region in eastern France. On 1 January 2016, it was merged into the new commune of La Chailleuse.

== Population ==
Historical population

Year	Pop.	±% p.a.
1793	751	—
1821	676	−0.38%
1846	577	−0.63%
1872	499	−0.56%
1901	408	−0.69%
1926	338	−0.75%
1946	300	−0.59%

Year	Pop.	±% p.a.
1962	241	−1.36%
1968	203	−2.82%
1975	198	−0.36%
1982	243	+2.97%
1990	260	+0.85%
1999	276	+0.67%
2018	328	+0.91%

Source: EHESS and INSEE

== See also ==
- Communes of the Jura department
