= LaRoche, South Dakota =

LaRoche is a ghost town in Stanley County, in the U.S. state of South Dakota.

== History ==
The community has the name of Joe La Roche, a cattleman. A post office called La Roche was established in 1916, and remained in operation until 1942. Besides the post office, LaRoche had a school located at 44.2383175°N 99.9234535°W.
