= Meysse =

- Commune
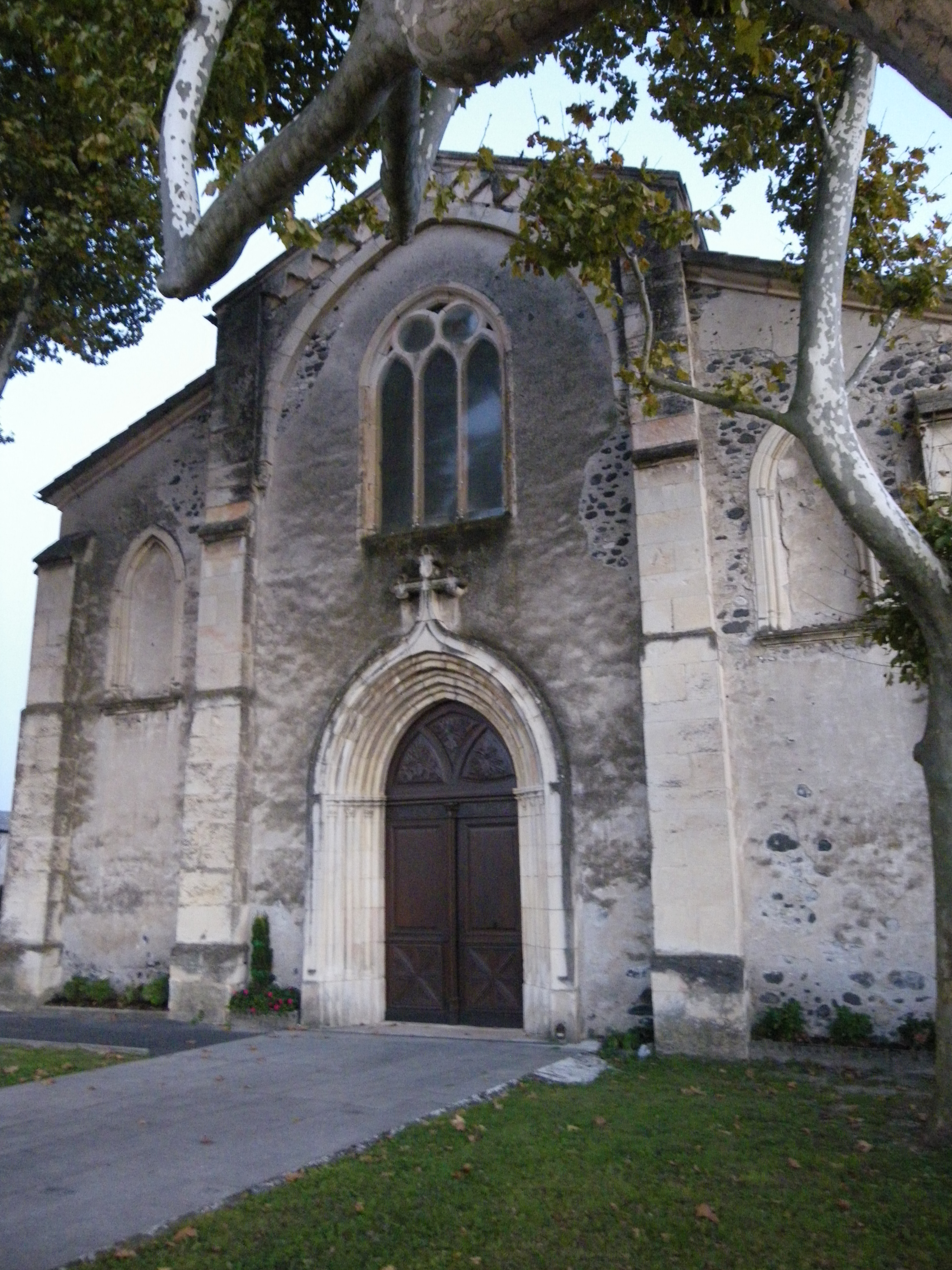
- The church in Meysse
- Location of Meysse
- Location within France Location within Auvergne-Rhône-Alpes
- Coordinates: 44°36′37″N 4°43′23″E
- Country: France
- Region: Auvergne-Rhône-Alpes
- Department: Ardèche
- Arrondissement: Privas
- Canton: Le Pouzin

Government
  - Mayor (2020–2026): Eric Cuer
- Area^{1}: 19.18 km^{2} (7.41 sq mi)
- Elevation: 82 m (269 ft)
- Highest elevation: 680 m (2,230 ft)
- Lowest elevation: 66 m (217 ft)
- Population (2023): 1,366
  - Density: 71.22/km^{2} (184.5/sq mi)
- Time zone: UTC+01:00 (CET)
  - Summer (DST): UTC+02:00 (CEST)
- INSEE/Postal code: 07157 /07400
- ^{1} French Land Register data, which excludes lakes, ponds, glaciers > 1 km^{2} (0.386 sq mi or 247 acres) and river estuaries.

Meysse (French pronunciation: [mɛs]; Occitan: Mèissa) is a commune in the Ardèche department in southern France.

== Population ==
Historical population
Year	Pop.	±% p.a.
1968	679	—
1975	590	−1.99%
1982	708	+2.64%
1990	914	+3.24%
1999	1,098	+2.06%
2007	1,309	+2.22%
2012	1,351	+0.63%
2017	1,319	−0.48%
2023	1,366	+0.59%
Source: INSEE

== See also ==
- Communes of the Ardèche department
