= Laroche Wines =

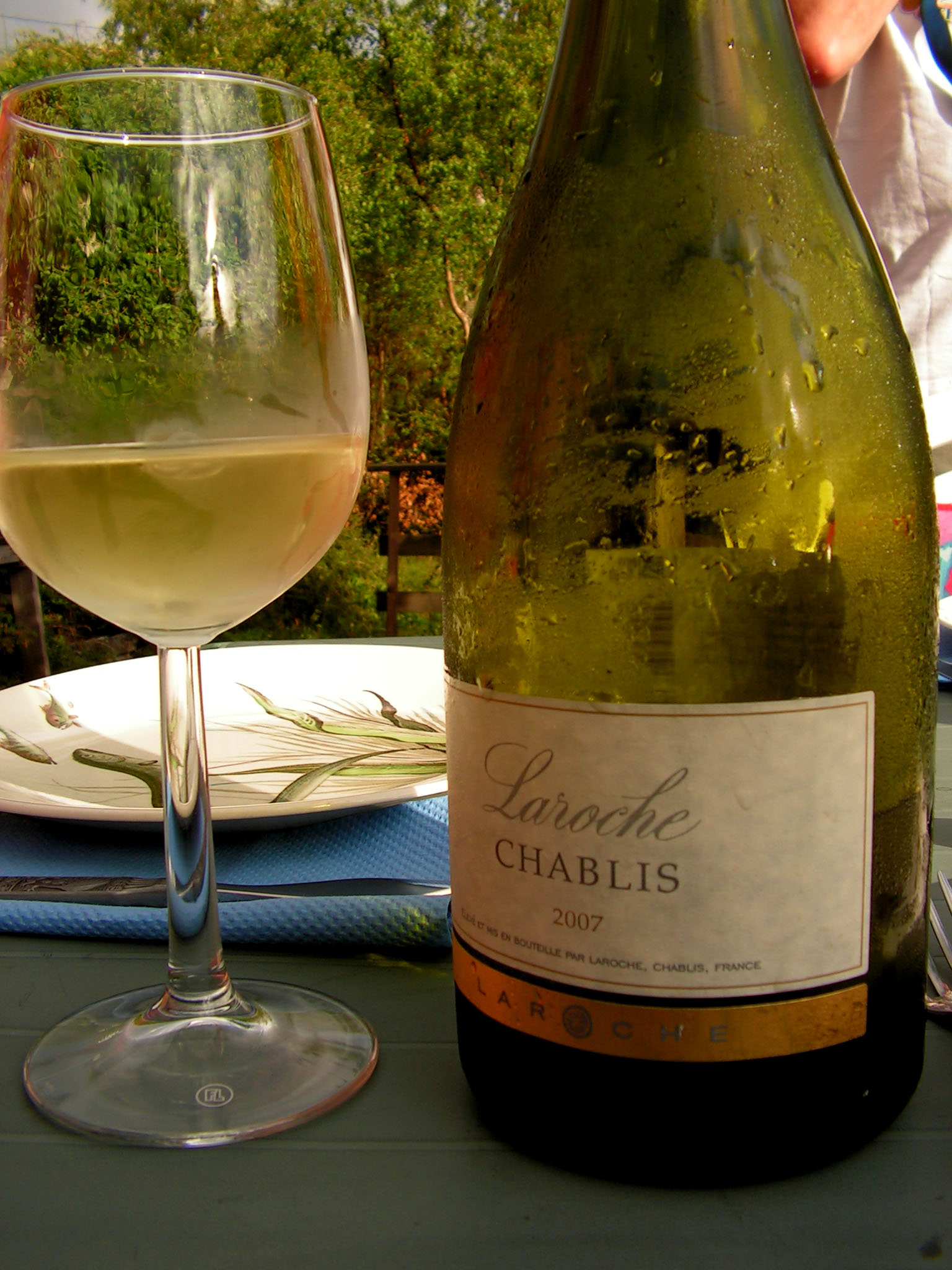
A Chablis from Laroche

Laroche Wines is a French-based wine company. The Laroche family has been producing wine in Chablis since 1850, but the first vintage did not come until 1860. In 1950s and 1960s, the vineyards were hit hard by Phylloxera and spring frost, meaning there were virtually no production. In the 2000s, the entire Laroche Wines Chablis range became fully enclosed by screw caps rather than corks, including the Chablis Grand Crus, becoming the first house in France to do so.

== Wineries ==
Today Laroche owns four wineries:

- Domaine Laroche in Chablis, France
- Mas La Chevalière in the south of France
- Viña Punto Alto in the Casablanca valley in Chile
- L'Avenir in Stellenbosch, South Africa
