= Saint-Pierre-la-Roche =

- Commune
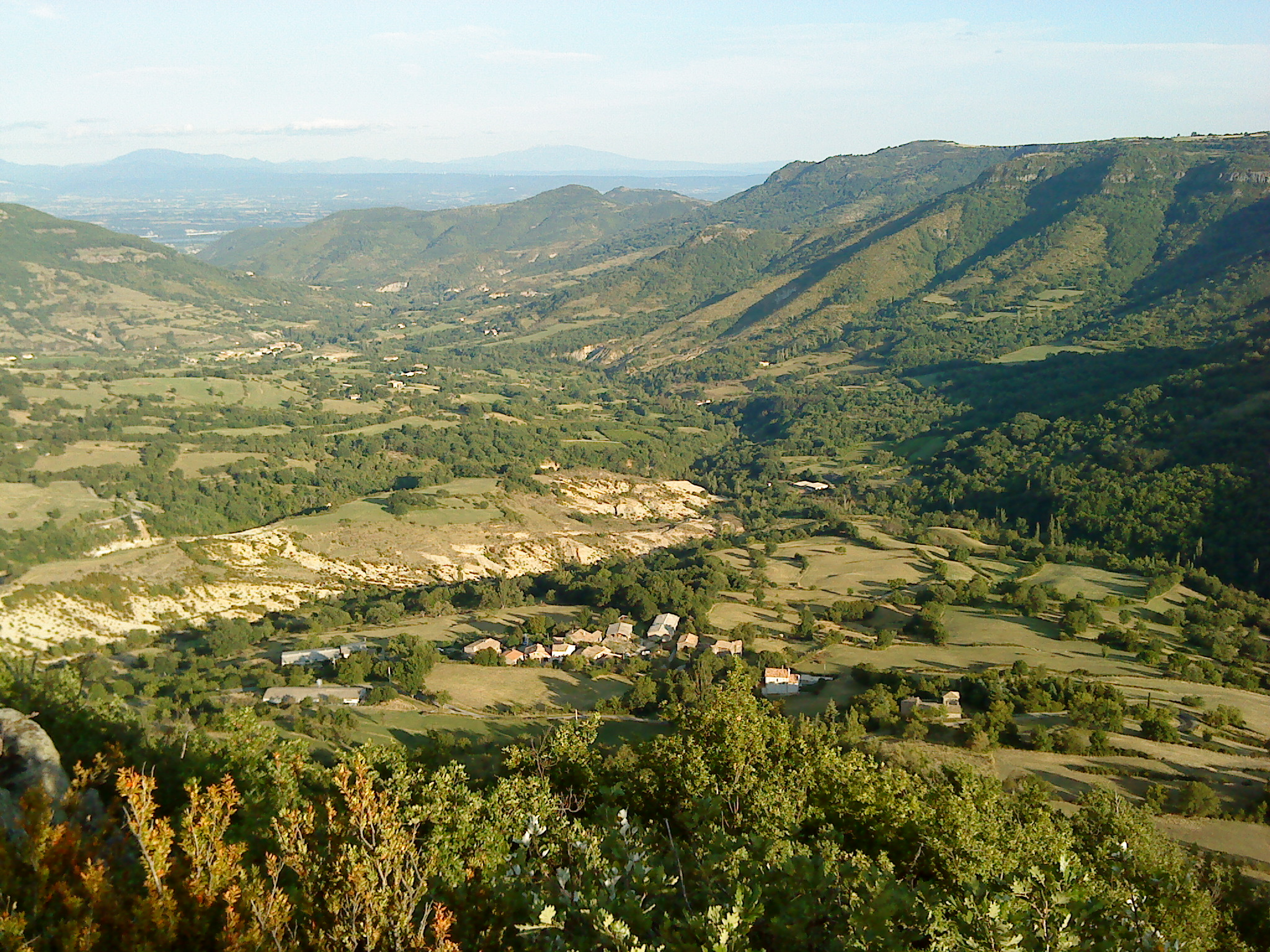
- Les Molières, within Saint-Pierre-la-Roche
- Location of Saint-Pierre-la-Roche
- Location within France Location within Auvergne-Rhône-Alpes
- Coordinates: 44°39′02″N 4°37′27″E
- Country: France
- Region: Auvergne-Rhône-Alpes
- Department: Ardèche
- Arrondissement: Privas
- Canton: Le Pouzin

Government
  - Mayor (2020–2026): Stéphanie Labeille
- Area^{1}: 9.92 km^{2} (3.83 sq mi)
- Elevation: 400 m (1,300 ft)
- Highest elevation: 711 m (2,333 ft)
- Lowest elevation: 280 m (920 ft)
- Population (2023): 67
  - Density: 6.8/km^{2} (17/sq mi)
- Time zone: UTC+01:00 (CET)
  - Summer (DST): UTC+02:00 (CEST)
- INSEE/Postal code: 07283 /07400
- ^{1} French Land Register data, which excludes lakes, ponds, glaciers > 1 km^{2} (0.386 sq mi or 247 acres) and river estuaries.

Saint-Pierre-la-Roche (French pronunciation: [sɛ̃ pjɛʁ la ʁɔʃ]; Occitan: Sant Pèire de la Ròcha) is a commune in the Ardèche department in southern France.

== Population ==
Historical population
Year	Pop.	±% p.a.
1968	76	—
1975	60	−3.32%
1982	51	−2.29%
1990	54	+0.72%
1999	46	−1.77%
2007	52	+1.54%
2012	53	+0.38%
2017	59	+2.17%
2023	67	+2.14%
Source: INSEE

== See also ==
- Communes of the Ardèche department
