= La Roche-Vanneau =

- Commune
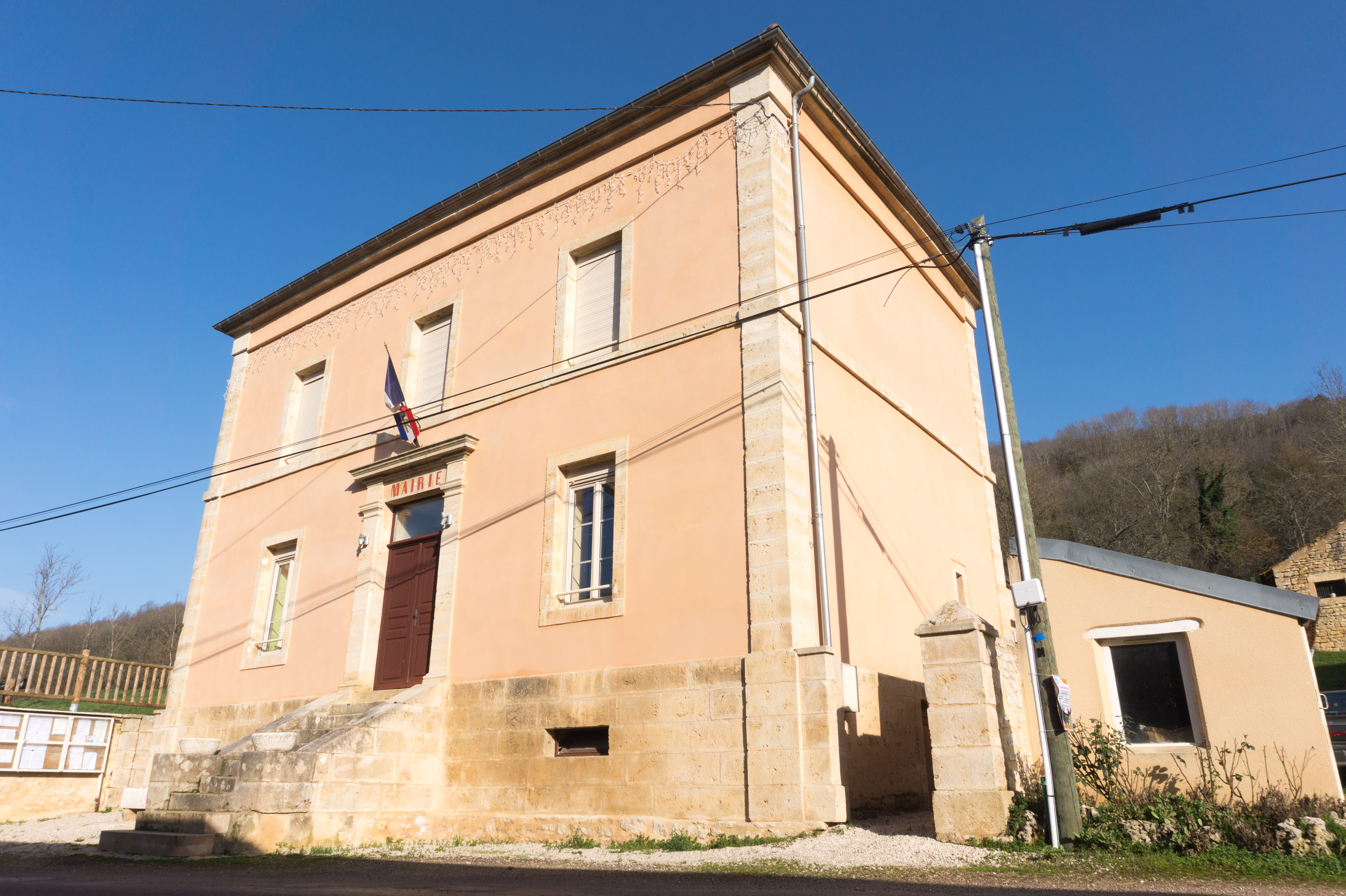
- Town hall

- Coat of arms
- Location of La Roche-Vanneau
- Location within France Location within Bourgogne-Franche-Comté
- Coordinates: 47°28′27″N 4°31′37″E
- Country: France
- Region: Bourgogne-Franche-Comté
- Department: Côte-d'Or
- Arrondissement: Montbard
- Canton: Montbard

Government
  - Mayor (2020–2026): Brigitte Lemoine
- Area^{1}: 13.19 km^{2} (5.09 sq mi)
- Elevation: 448 m (1,470 ft)
- Highest elevation: 494 m (1,621 ft)
- Lowest elevation: 264 m (866 ft)
- Population (2023): 135
  - Density: 10.2/km^{2} (26.5/sq mi)
- Time zone: UTC+01:00 (CET)
  - Summer (DST): UTC+02:00 (CEST)
- INSEE/Postal code: 21528 /21150
- ^{1} French Land Register data, which excludes lakes, ponds, glaciers > 1 km^{2} (0.386 sq mi or 247 acres) and river estuaries.

La Roche-Vanneau (French pronunciation: [la ʁɔʃ vano]) is a commune in the Côte-d'Or department in eastern France.

== Population ==
Historical population
Year	Pop.	±% p.a.
1968	163	—
1975	147	−1.47%
1982	136	−1.10%
1990	172	+2.98%
1999	142	−2.11%
2007	133	−0.82%
2012	154	+2.98%
2017	146	−1.06%
2023	135	−1.30%
Source: INSEE

== See also ==
- Communes of the Côte-d'Or department
