= La Roche-sur-le-Buis =

- Commune
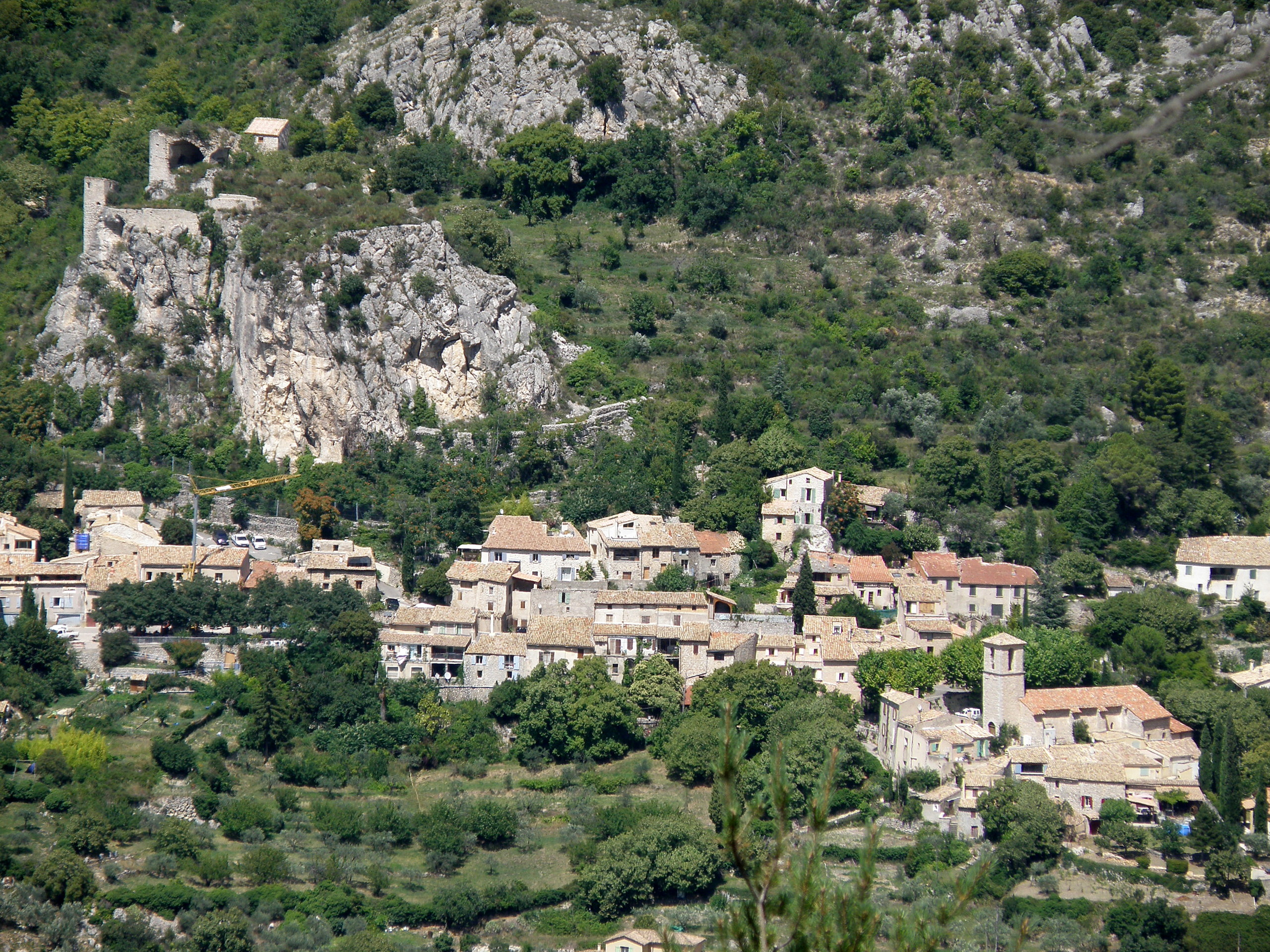
- A general view of La Roche-sur-le-Buis
- Location of La Roche-sur-le-Buis
- Location within France Location within Auvergne-Rhône-Alpes
- Coordinates: 44°16′40″N 5°18′46″E
- Country: France
- Region: Auvergne-Rhône-Alpes
- Department: Drôme
- Arrondissement: Nyons
- Canton: Nyons et Baronnies

Government
  - Mayor (2020–2026): Michel Grégoire
- Area^{1}: 27.72 km^{2} (10.70 sq mi)
- Elevation: 638 m (2,093 ft)
- Highest elevation: 1,369 m (4,491 ft)
- Lowest elevation: 394 m (1,293 ft)
- Population (2023): 281
  - Density: 10.1/km^{2} (26.3/sq mi)
- Time zone: UTC+01:00 (CET)
  - Summer (DST): UTC+02:00 (CEST)
- INSEE/Postal code: 26278 /26170
- ^{1} French Land Register data, which excludes lakes, ponds, glaciers > 1 km^{2} (0.386 sq mi or 247 acres) and river estuaries.

La Roche-sur-le-Buis (French pronunciation: [la ʁɔʃ syʁ lə bɥi], literally La Roche on the Buis; Occitan: La Ròcha dau Bois) is a commune in the Drôme department in southeastern France.

== Population ==
Historical population
Year	Pop.	±% p.a.
1968	134	—
1975	147	+1.33%
1982	196	+4.20%
1990	211	+0.93%
1999	287	+3.48%
2007	324	+1.53%
2012	311	−0.82%
2017	288	−1.52%
2023	281	−0.41%
Source: INSEE

== See also ==
- Communes of the Drôme department
