= Cécile Guieu =

French marine biogeochemist

Cécile Guieu (born 1963) is a French marine biogeochemist whose research concerns the effects of external inputs from the atmosphere and fluvial sediment processes on marine biogeochemical cycles. She is a director of research for the French National Centre for Scientific Research (CNRS), affiliated with the Observatoire Oceanologique de Villefranche, a satellite campus of Sorbonne University.

== Education and career ==
Guieu is the daughter of two professors, in geology and in life and earth sciences. After a licenciate in earth sciences from the University of Science and Technology of Languedoc, part of Montpellier 2 University, in 1986, she continued her studies in hydrology and earth science at Pierre and Marie Curie University and the École normale supérieure (Paris). She received a master's degree in 1987, completed her Ph.D. in 1991, and received a habilitation at Pierre and Marie Curie University in 2000. Her doctoral dissertation, Apports atmospheriques a la mediterranee nord-occidentale, was directed by Jean-Marie Martin.

She was a postdoctoral researcher at CNRS from 1991 to 1992, at the University of Rhode Island in the United States from 1992 to 1993, and at Texas A&M University from 1993 to 1994. She took a permanent position at CNRS in 1994, initially with the Institute of Marine Geochemistry in Montrouge, near Paris. She moved to the Observatoire Oceanologique de Villefranche in 1998.

== Recognition ==
Guieu was the 2009 recipient of the Manley Bendall Prize of the Societé d'Océanographie de France. She was elected to Academia Europaea in 2017.
